The following is a list of characters in the Teenage Mutant Ninja Turtles franchise.

Overview
 This table shows the recurring characters and the actors who have portrayed them throughout the franchise.
 A dark grey cell indicates the character was not in the series or film, or that the character's presence in the series or film has not yet been announced.
 A  indicates an appearance as a younger version of a pre-existing character.
 A  indicates a cameo appearance.
 A  indicates an appearance in onscreen photographs only.
 A  indicates an appearance in deleted scenes only.
 A  indicates a motion-capture role.
 A  indicates an uncredited role.

Main Characters
In most versions, the Teenage Mutant Ninja Turtles are created when four baby turtles are exposed to radioactive ooze, transforming them into humanoids.

Leonardo

Leonardo, nicknamed Leo, is the oldest brother and leader of the Ninja turtles, as well as the most disciplined and skilled. Calm, cool, and collected, he always attempts to help his brothers to be the best ninjas they can be. Because of his leadership, he's often challenged with the constant rebellion of Raphael. An expert swordsman, he wields two katanas and wears an ocean blue mask.

Raphael

Raphael, nicknamed Raph, is the second-oldest and physically strongest turtle. Rebellious, cynical and quick witted, he is often driven by his strong emotions and often displays animosity towards his older brother, Leonardo, over his leadership and their conflicting methods. His quick temper tends to get the better of him, but he openly loves his brothers, father, and allies. He wears a red mask and uses a pair of sai.

Donatello

Donatello, nicknamed Don or Donnie, is the smartest and gentlest of the Turtles. An intellectual, he often attempts to find an alternative way of reaching his goals. Using his intellect he invents gadgets and vehicles. He's typically the passive turtle and Leonardo's second-in-command, playing the part of peacekeeper between his two older brothers. Studying the art of Bojutsu, he wears a purple mask and wields an oak Bō.

Michelangelo

Michelangelo, nicknamed Mike or Mikey, is the least disciplined and most fun-loving turtle. He is usually portrayed as the most agile and naturally gifted, contrasting his free spirit and inability to take training seriously. He often uses southern Californian surfer dialect and expresses his love of Pizza whenever brought up. He wears an orange bandana and fights using nunchucks.

Splinter

Splinter is the mutant rat sensei and adoptive father of the Ninja Turtles. Generally depicted as wise and powerful, he raised the four turtles and trained them in the art of Ninjutsu. He is very cautious and protective of them, constantly warning them of the dangers on the surface.

April O'Neil

April O'Neil is a confident, courageous, benevolent, intelligent, and outgoing human companion of the Ninja Turtles. She met the Turtles when they saved her from a squadron of MOUSERS chasing her down the sewers. She embarked on many of the Turtles' adventures and aids them by doing the work in public while the Turtles cannot.

Casey Jones

Casey Jones is a hockey-masked vigilante, armed with an assortment of sporting goods that he carries in a golf bag. He is a close ally of the Ninja Turtles, who he met after having a fight with Raphael.

Recurring characters

Hamato Yoshi

Hamato Yoshi is a ninjutsu master whose history is always intertwined with Splinter's. In most versions, Splinter is either his pet rat or a mutated form of Yoshi himself.

Mighty Mutanimals

Dreadmon
Dreadmon was a mutant red wolf and deceased ally of the Ninja Turtles. He was a human South African native. He and his mother moved to Jamaica after they were exiled from their tribe by Dreadmon's father, an outspoken apartheid opponent, as he feared for their safety. Growing up as a teenage thief living in abject poverty, Dreadmon eventually stole a magical talisman and unwittingly used it to mutate himself into a humanoid red wolf-like form. Despite this, he became friends with the Ninja Turtles and later joined the Mighty Mutanimals with his best friend, Jagwar.

Jagwar
Jagwar was a mutant jaguar and deceased ally of the Ninja Turtles.

Jagwar was the son of the Amazon tribal woman, Juntarra, and was a powerful jaguar spirit. His mother left him out in the jungle to fend for himself as she went on a personal quest to find the "path of the four winds". Growing up, he quickly befriended the Ninja Turtles when the aftermath of an intergalactic adventure crash-landed them back to Earth and into his jungle. Together, Jagwar helped them out on a mission to rescue April O'Neil and a tribe of enslaved natives from a band of mercenaries who were threatening to cut down his rainforest home. This heroic act later earned him a place in the Mighty Mutanimals alongside his best friend, Dreadmon.

Jagwar appears in the IDW comics as a female member of the Pantheon.

Leatherhead

Leatherhead is a mutant American alligator and hot-headed ally of the Ninja Turtles.

Mondo Gecko
Mondo Gecko is a mutant green gecko, one of the first teenage allies of the Ninja Turtles, and a close friend of Michelangelo.

As a human professional skateboarder, he spent more of his teenage life playing in a local heavy metal band and always had his girlfriend, Candy Fine, stick by him. One day, while the band was practicing in Shredder's former hideout, the Ninja Turtles tried to intervene by stating the dangers inside. Mondo already got Krang's discarded mutagen on himself, thus mutating into a humanoid green gecko due to placing his pet green gecko on his shoulder. As a result, he was forced to leave the band and break up with Candy. The Turtles eventually turned his problems around by recruiting him as a member of the Mighty Mutanimals, unwittingly earning back Candy's faith.

In the 1987 cartoon, Mondo (voiced by John Mariano) was a baby green gecko that was dropped into the sewers and mutated into his current mutant form by the same mutagen that mutated the Ninja Turtles and Splinter. However, he was later taken and raised by a street gang led by Mr. X. When Michelangelo found out, he convinced Mondo to turn on his boss. After receiving his change of heart, Mondo helped fight Mr. X and ended his criminal career, moving to the sewers as a neighbor of the Turtles and Splinter.

In the IDW comics, Mondo was part of a mutant army established by Old Hob after being mutated by Hob's ally, Lindsey Baker.

In the 2012 cartoon, Mondo (voiced by Robbie Rist) was introduced as Jason, a teenage skateboarding star who was skating home one night when a vial of mutagen fell on his head. As he had placed his pet leopard gecko, Lars, on his shoulder, he mutated into a  humanoid mutant leopard gecko. He was abandoned by his parents out on the streets, where he spent his days skateboarding until he was taken in as an errand boy by Fishface (who was called "Mr. X" by his underlings). Mondo made quick friends with Michelangelo and Casey Jones, and eventually saw the true colors of his boss when he was challenged to race against him. Thus, he defected from the Foot Clan and became friends with the Ninja Turtles. He later befriended Muckman and was recruited as transportation specialist of the Mighty Mutanimals as they worked with the Turtles to save the Earth from getting destroyed by the Triceratons.

Ray Fillet
Ray Fillet (originally called Man Ray) is a mutant manta ray and small-time marine life ally of the Ninja Turtles on various occasions.

Ray Fillet was originally Jack Finney, a human marine biologist who worked the Boroughs Aquarium in New Jersey. One night, Finney was scuba-diving into a pipe on Bayview Beach, when a barrel of mutagen was accidentally spilled into the pipe by Bebop and Rocksteady. The mutagen polluted the water and washed him into the river. Finney mutated into a humanoid manta ray due to holding one of the aquarium's manta rays during a marine biology show and began taking action to stop Shredder's Fourth of July scheme. After saving the Ninja Turtles from a torpedo launched by the Foot Clan from their submarine, Ray defeated Shredder in a fist-fight underwater and dragged him to shore. However, Shredder saw the opportunity to kick sand in his face as a means of making his escape. Later on, Ray continued to help the Turtles on occasional missions and was recruited as a member of the Mighty Mutanimals.

In the IDW comics, Ray was a mutant prisoner of the Null Group alongside Sally Pride until they were freed and recruited by Old Hob's Mighty Mutanimals.

A different character of the same name appears in the 1987 cartoon. This version of Ray is the creation of mad scientist Dr Polidorius and joins him in a plot to sink New York into the sea (although Ray has no real loyalty to Polidorius and only agrees to aid him because "I got nothing better to do.") When Polidorius is thwarted, Ray simply swims off into the sea, leaving the Turtles to wonder what became of him (Leonardo doubts they've seen the last of Ray, but the character never appeared again in this series).

Ray appears as a boss and/or playable character in the Genesis version of Teenage Mutant Ninja Turtles: Tournament Fighters.

Wingnut and Screwloose
Wingnut and Screwloose are an alien or mutant bat and mosquito who are both allies of the Ninja Turtles.

As the only living members of two alien species from the Dimension X planet Dexion V. Their homeworld was eventually wiped clean of life due to an invasion made by Krang, leaving the Wingnut and Screwloose homeless in the dimension's stump area. The duo later found their way to Earth, where they came in conflict with the Ninja Turtles after attacking and destroying their blimp (which was hovering over the New York City skyline in search of Krang). The Turtles learnt that the only reason the duo attacked was because they thought the Turtles were working for Krang. So, the Turtles teamed up with Wingnut and Screwloose in a battle against Krang and the Foot Clan for the Turnstone, thus gaining the duo's trust for earthly mutants and granting them two memberships in the Mighty Mutanimals.

In the 1987 cartoon, Wingnut (voiced by Rob Paulsen) and Screwloose (voiced by Townsend Coleman) are a pair of terrorist mutants from the Dimension X planet Flagenon who tried to brainwash the children of their homeworld into invading Earth.

In the 2012 cartoon, Wingnut (voiced by Daran Norris) and Screwloose (voiced by Jeff Bennett) are a pair superheroes from a comic book the Mikey and Casey summoned using April's crystal were the reference Batman and Robin.

Wingnut appears as a boss in the 2022 beat-'em-up Teenage Mutant Ninja Turtles: Shredder's Revenge. He also appears as a boss/playable character in the SNES version of Teenage Mutant Ninja Turtles: Tournament Fighters.

Slash
Slash is a humanoid turtle who is either an enemy or ally of the Ninja Turtles depending on the version.

In the Archie comics continuity, he is part of a turtle-like alien species on a tropical planet in Dimension X. Slash's home world was eventually destroyed by alien invaders, leaving him the only homeless survivor of his kind. He was later found by Krang, who made a deal with him to find his way back to Earth, and in return, Slash came under the former's leadership and kept the Ninja Turtles busy while Krang sought to possess Shredder's body, but to no avail. Slash's rampage caught the attention of the Mighty Mutanimals, who captured him and brought him to their island. With Leatherhead's help, Slash was able to control his violent spree and informed that he would be allowed to stay in a grove of lush palm trees he so loved. Grateful, he went on to become a member of the Mutanimals, ultimately sacrificing himself later to save the Turtles.

In the 1987 cartoon, Slash (voiced by Pat Fraley) was Bebop's pet turtle, mutated by Rocksteady to carry out an assignment that Shredder wanted them to do. However, when the plastic palm tree he loved in his tank was accidentally dropped down an air duct by Bebop, Slash went berserk and stole Shredder's shaolin, chasing them around the Technodrome before going to Earth on Bebop's part. There, he ran into a corrupt businessman building condos in the sewers until the Ninja Turtles foiled it. As payback, the businessman sent Slash to smash the Freedom Bell, which would tarnish the Turtle's reputation and give them a bad name. The Turtles eventually stopped them and sent Slash into space aboard a trash rocket, which unknowingly contained a plastic palm tree that he was so content of. After having a run-in with a race of super-intelligent aliens who hooked him up to a machine to grant him their intelligence, Slash returned to Earth with fancy weaponry and equipment of his own design and planned to turn everyone into turtles to become the number 1 supreme turtle. This was foiled when Donatello tricked him into thinking that he turned the Turtles into humans to lure Slash into a rooftop fight. Thus, Slash was reverted to his low-level intelligence and launched into space once again.

In the IDW comics, Slash was introduced as Specimen 6, a snapping turtle experiment at StockGen mutated with Old Hob's DNA assigned to hunt down the Ninja Turtles and Splinter. However, his mind became unstable and gave him a savage nature, so Specimen 6 was contained in a special tank guarded by the Rock Soldiers. He was later freed due to April O'Neil's diversion to retrieve the Turtle Tracker for the Ninja Turtles. After punching one of the Rock Soldiers, he escaped from the lab into the night. From then, Slash began lurking around the city as a mindless monster injuring people and damaging their property, such as attacking Michelangelo's pizza-delivering friend Woody and leaving scratch marks on April's van. After ripping off the shirt of a thug the Turtles just apprehended, he followed them to an abandoned church and attacked them in the church basement. Though proven more powerful than the Turtles, Slash was accidentally impaled by Leonardo and left to fall into the sewers. He eventually survived the wound and was washed ashore to be woken up by Old Hob, who told him that they should work together to hunt down anyone with a connection to StockGen. Slash was shown the error of his ways when Michelangelo gave him a candy bar that he instantly fell in love with. He agreed to help the Turtles escape from one of Shredder's traps. He was an integral part of a mission to reclaim Leonardo from the Foot Clan, and developed a strong antipathy towards Hun, whom he knew as the "Dragon Man." At the mission's conclusion, he was given a new black mask by Leonardo, as well as a bladed gauntlet. Slash's life changed forever when Hob began producing new mutants, but discovered that Lindsey Baker's psychotropic compound was crucial to the process. He took a syringe of Splinter's compound-infused blood, declaring that he wanted to be a "hero" like Michelangelo. Mikey tried to reassure Slash that he himself was not even a hero and that the two of them were both still just children, but Slash injected himself anyway. After a few minutes of agonizing pain, he suddenly began to think more clearly and speak more eloquently than before. With his new intelligence, he became the co-founder of Hob's new mutant army, the Mutanimals, and was involved in Hob and Splinter's attack on the Foot Clan.

In the 2012 cartoon, Slash (voiced by Corey Feldman) was introduced as Spike, a young box turtle who was flushed into the sewers from his original owner's home and saved from drowning by Raphael, who took him in as his pet. He used to listen to his owner's angry ranting about his troubles with his family and learned ninjutsu by watching Raphael practice it in his room. Although no one knew at the time, Spike even developed a hatred for the Ninja Turtles, thanks to hearing Raphael's angry chants all his life. Obtaining a mace, Slash joined the other Turtles on patrol but revealed his true intentions by beating Donatello and Michelangelo, to Raphael's horror. The following murderous spree nearly took Leonardo's life. After engaging his former owner, he survived the fall off the roof top and fled into the night. However, the incident left Raphael with a lasting regret. Slash was captured a few times by the Krang during several run-ins with them. In the last of these run-ins, he was freed by Newtralizer and allied with him to start a violent but effective crusade against the krang. Despite having a dislike for the Turtles, he still shares the same beliefs they were taught regarding protection of the innocent. So, when the amoral Newtralizer to destroy all humans and krang, Slash realized the position he put Raphael in and sided with the Turtles and Casey Jones to stop him. He then made amends with them and declines the offer to rejoin their team before departing, saying that he was better operating solo. As soon as the Krang's invasion started, Raphael began hoping that Slash survived. He eventually did, however, and was later recruited as leader of the Mighty Mutanimals as they worked with the Turtles to take back the city from the Krang.

Slash appears as a boss in the video games Teenage Mutant Ninja Turtles III: The Manhattan Project, the  Super NES version of Teenage Mutant Ninja Turtles: Turtles in Time and Teenage Mutant Ninja Turtles: Shredder's Revenge.

Mutagen Man
Mutagen Man is a character in the "Teenage Mutant Ninja Turtles" franchise that suffers a bizarre encounter with mutagen that exposes his internal organs and resides in a special robotic suit.

In the 1987 cartoon, Mutagen Man (voiced by Rob Paulsen) was introduced as Seymour Gutz, a nerdy mailman who became dismembered after falling into a special vat of mutagen.

In the IDW comics, Mutagen Man is a failed attempt at combining several different animal breeds into one mutant. When The Mutanimals found him strapped to a bed, they tried to free him. Although he is told that he's being saved, Mutagen Man has a different idea of the term by forcing Old Hob's gun to his dome and urging him to fire. Hob refuses and they all escape the facility together. Later, Mutagen Man was given the name "Seymour Guts" by Mondo Gecko.

In the 2012 cartoon, Mutagen Man (voiced by Roger Craig Smith) was introduced as Timothy, a young ineffective ice cream vendor who, after witnessing the Turtles' first battle with Baxter Stockman from his apartment window, dedicated himself into fighting crime as a wannabe superhero in a turtle costume called The Pulverizer.

Ninjara
Ninjara's real name is Umeko, but for reasons that were never fully revealed she goes by the name "Ninjara." While Splinter first thought she was an "atomic child", she was actually once part of an ancient race of humanoid foxes living on a hidden island off the coast of Japan. She ended up becoming a thief and assassin for the villainous dog-man Chien Kahn, but then had a change of heart when she met the Turtles, and fell in love with Raphael. She helped out on many missions, from the Far and the Middle East to Dimension X. Her family life was explored more in detail when her younger brother managed to track her down and convince her to come back home. The Turtles discovered the island was hidden by fog banks, but despite this, it had been discovered by an opportunistic, greedy hunter. She was a powerful member of the team from issue #29 until issue #70.

Fugitoid
Professor Zayton Honeycutt, also known as Dr. Zayton Honeycut, is a semi-retired scientist from the planet D'Hoonib whose mind was transferred into his working robot as both were struck by lightning. As he refused to build a transmat device (a means of teleportation) for General Blanque of the Federation military in their war against the Triceraton Republic, he was categorized as a "Fugitoid" (short for "fugitive android"). The character was introduced in a series of strips in the Gobbledygook comics that was later finished in a one-off self-titled comic book and then guest starred in the original TMNT issues 5 to 7, later became a recurring character in the main TMNT comic.

In the IDW comics, Professor Honeycutt was a Neutrino scientist who used to work for Krang. Honeycutt's wife Marra worried about the influence of evil that was oppressing the Neutrino people, including their family. She convinced him that they should join the Neutrino resistance, and so they did. Three months later, Krang's armies had found where the resistance compound was and targeted it for attack. A fire broke out, and the living quarters were locked down due to safety protocols. Rather than let Marra, their son Ely, and the rest of the families burn to death, Honeycutt used SAL to breach the flames and override the safety protocols. By doing so, he sacrificed his own body where he became trapped within SAL in the process. Honeycutt saved the families, but his victory was short-lived. Sergeant Granitor ordered an attack on the fleeing families killing them all. Honeycutt could do nothing but watch them die on the security monitor. Not long after, Honeycutt had made it back to the lab, and Granitor and some Rock Soldiers found him. Honeycutt restrained himself from tearing apart the man who gave orders to kill his family and instead escaped through the portal he had been working on. Now in New York City on Earth, Honeycutt masqueraded as a blonde male to hide from the Rock Soldiers. Honeycutt took a job with Baxter Stockman at StockGen calling himself Chet Allen. Stockman worked with Krang, so Honeycutt was hidden within plain sight. Krang referred to the professor's new form as a "fugitive android." Rather than involve more innocents in the fight, Honeycutt allied himself with the Foot Clan. Although Honeycutt knew the Foot Clan were evil, they were enemies of Krang and his forces as well.

The Fugitoid appeared in the 2003 Teenage Mutant Ninja Turtles cartoon voiced by Oliver Wyman. Here his mind was transferred into the robotic body of his helper robot SAL after the pair were struck by lightning while Honeycutt was wearing a psychic amplifier device. Both the Triceratons and the Federation pursued him seeking to obtain his Teleportal device in order to gain the upper hand in their ongoing conflict, but Honeycutt found surprising allies in the Turtles. They wound up back on Earth courtesy of the Utroms' transmat, which later transported Honeycutt and the Utroms to their homeworld. However, upon learning that the Triceratons had pursued him to Earth, Honeycutt returned there after erasing the Teleportal blueprints from his mind. He was eventually captured by the Federation, but managed to infect their fleet with a computer virus that shut them down, with his body being fried in the process. Honeycutt's sacrifice touched both sides, and a peace soon resulted between the two. Honeycutt later returned, having uploaded a copy of his mind into Earth's satellite network prior to his demise. Leatherhead later built him a new body using Earth technology, and he would continue to provide aid to the Turtles, eventually officiating at April and Casey's wedding. He is also a playable character in the brawler game "Teenage Mutant Ninja Turtles: Smash Up" for the Wii.

The Fugitoid appears in the 2012 TV Series, voiced by David Tennant. He first appears at the conclusion of season 3 aboard his vessel, the Ulixes, just in time to save the Turtles, April O'Neil, and Casey Jones from a black hole created by the Triceratons. After they escape, he introduces himself and promises them that they are about to embark upon a great adventure. He revealed that he was a normal scientist until his body was destroyed by the Triceratons for turning down their offer to make weapons for them. His brain survived and was placed in the body of his robotic assistant, and he set out to stop the Triceratons from causing any more harm. He also formed an alliance with the Utrom some time prior to becoming a cyborg, and later approached them with the Turtles in an effort to learn the whereabouts of the black hole generator fragments. The reason for Fugitoid's involvement was later revealed in "Earth's Last Stand": he had created the black hole generator and then sold it to the krang, only learning later the ghastly use to which it would be put. Despite the distrust this prompts in the Turtles, April, and Casey, Fugitoid manages to recover the generator and execute his plan: combining his power source and that of his ship to destroy the generator while wiping out the Triceraton fleet in the process. A past version of the Fugitoid then arrives and takes the now duplicate versions of April, Casey, and the Turtles on an adventure; meanwhile, in the wreckage of the Triceraton fleet, present-day Honeycutt's head is shown to be intact and apparently partially functional.

Despite being something of a major character, the Fugitoid makes no video game appearances.

Supporting characters and allies

Tang Shen
Tang Shen appears in the Mirage comics.

Then Shen appears in the IDW comics as Hamato Yoshi's wife.

In this 2D animated 2003 version, Tang Shen debuted in flashbacks in the Season 4 episode "Tale of Master Yoshi", which was told by Leonardo to Splinter and the other Turtles. In this version, Tang Shen had been an orphan raised by the Ancient One, in Tokyo, Japan, who eventually took in the orphaned Hamato Yoshi and his friend Yukio Mashimi as his own sons. As the years passed, she fell in love with Hamato Yoshi, and took in a hungry, innocent rat as a pet. As her bond with Yoshi strengthened, an even greater rift occurred in Yoshi's longtime friendship with Mashimi. Blinded by jealously and hatred, Yukio had ruthlessly murdered Tang Shen in cold blood. Her premature demise is what prompted Hamato Yoshi to challenge his former best friend and adopted brother to a duel. It was Tang Shen's everlasting kindness, beauty and love that made him name the pet rat "Splinter". Her grave is located on a hill of flowers, where Hamato Yoshi was eventually laid to rest as well.

In the Teenage Mutant Ninja Turtles (2012 TV series), Tang Shen had been the loving wife of Hamato Yoshi (who eventually mutated into the mutant-rat Splinter), and had borne a daughter whom they named Miwa. Her decision in choosing Hamato Yoshi over his adopted brother, Oroku Saki, had caused intense hatred to fester between them. Further taken over by vengeance, jealously and rage, Oroku Saki had staged an attack on Yoshi, attempting to finish him once and for all. However, Tang Shen intervened to defend her husband; a fatal decision, as the final blow meant for Yoshi had struck her instead. Fifteen years after her tragic demise, Hamato Yoshi had moved to New York City (which had been her own desire), where he had purchased four baby turtles, encountered a krangdroid, and mutated into the rat-mutant Splinter via their mutagen. To keep her memory alive, several photographs of her remain with her husband in the Dojo, and a torn color picture (with her shoulder held by her husband Hamato Yoshi, who the Shredder had torn off to further make his fabrications more real) kept by her teenage daughter Miwa, who had been abducted by Oroku Saki as an infant and renamed Karai. She is even seen in memories of Splinter's. She makes her first and only live appearance in "Tale of the Yokai" when the Turtles travel back sixteen years previously via Renet's time specter. She had donned a plain white shirt, blue jeans, and had her waist-length jet-black hair loose. Seen holding her baby daughter Miwa, she expressed her joy at how beautiful the night sky was. She had expressed her dislike at her husband wanting to save the last of the Hamato clan, as she believed ninjas had no place in the modern world, not wanting her only child to follow in the path of her father. She was later approached by Oroku Saki, now clad in Foot Clan attire, and said that she had made her choice. She was asked to take little Miwa and leave as the two adopted brothers faced off in a death-duel. In the prequel episode "Lone Rat and Cub" Tang Shen was seen in the black-and-white picture of her next to her husband, holding their baby daughter between them. She was last seen in a vision of Splinter's when he debated whether he had the discipline to be a proper father, for either Miwa (were she alive) or the baby mutant Turtles.

Mr. O'Neil
There have been different versions of April's father in the TMNT franchise.

In the Mirage Comics, he is named Robert O'Neil. Not much is known of O'Neil, only that he is an antique dealer who owned his own shop, "Second Time Around", and a proficient businessman. One day his daughter Robyn was born, but his wife could no longer bear any children. In his examination of a few things that he purchased, but had not yet sorted, he had found a strange crystal, O'Neil attached the crystal to a pencil and was miraculously able to bring his drawings to life. O'Neil decided to satisfy his wife's desire to have children, but all of his attempts to create babies broke into nothing, as he had drawn them with a pencil. Sometime later O'Neil tried again with an ink pen, the result did not disappear this time and grew into a young woman: April.

Nearly thirty years later O'Neil died of a serious illness (probably cancer) and bequeathed his entire estate to his daughters, he gave April his old antique shop (but by then it was already destroyed by the Shredder and the Foot Clan when they had sought vengeance on April's new friends, the Turtles). All his life he had the secret of her origin concealed from April, until she had to learn through a chain of dramatic circumstances that she was not a naturally-born creature, and only some time later with Renet's Help was she finally able to discover the truth. This realization gave April a severe emotional crisis, and she left her old life behind for a while to find a new meaning to her existence.

In the 2012 series, he is named Kirby O'Neil, voiced by Keith Silverstein. In this show, Dr. Kirby is a psychologist, but was mutated into a mutant bat in the season 2 premiere "The Mutant Situation" and coined "Kirby Bat" until he was cured then turned in a human krang hybrid but became normal in season 3's "Battle for New York Part 2".

In the IDW Comics, April's father is named John O'Neil. John experienced a stroke that left him wheelchair-bound and reliant on his wife Elizabeth. Their daughter April considered abandoning her studies to help look after him, but her parents argued against it. Up until his stroke, John was employed as chief assistant at StockGen, the genetics laboratory of Baxter Stockman, which is responsible for the transformation of Splinter and the Turtles into mutants. He also knew of the Ooze, the base material for Stockman's experiments. It was through his initiative that April was able to secure her internship, through which she later became acquainted with the Turtles, but he and his wife already had a hunch that something in this laboratory was not right.

Some time later, the Turtles were traced by agents of the Foot Clan to the O'Neil Farm, while Elizabeth learned of the Turtles in a very dramatic way. After April and Splinter had declared her necessary, Elizabeth received from her daughter a vial of Ooze, which she used to heal her husband from the effects of his stroke. Then they returned to New York to be closer to their daughter, and opened their old antique shop again.
They later invited Casey to live with and work for them there, which attracted the ire of Hun. Fortunately, their neighbors on the same street came out to assist the O'Neils, and peace was restored.
During the Triceraton invasion, John and Elizabeth remained in the Second Time Around store for some days, anxious about April's safety. Eventually April and Baxter Stockman brought them to the T.C.R.I. building, where John and Elizabeth were reunited with their daughter.

In the 2014 film, April's father was referred to as Dr. O'Neil and was portrayed by Paul Fitzgerald. He was a scientist working at Sacks Groups Ltd as one of the creators of the TCRI mutagen. Splinter was the one who informed April that her father was killed by Eric Sacks and the Shredder destroying their lab.

Mrs. O'Neil
There have been different versions of Mrs. O'Neil in the TMNT franchise.

In the Mirage Comics, she was named Bridget O'Neil.

In the 3D CGI 2012 series, Mrs. O'Neil (voiced by Renae Jacobs) was the loving wife of the psychologist Kirby O'Neil, and the late mother of sixteen-year-old April O'Neil. Many decades ago, when she herself was a child, her grandfather had discovered the Krang residing deep underneath the O'Neil's family farmhouse. After unmistakably awakening the Krang, the brain-like extraterrestrial creatures paid him back by performing experiments on him and his entire bloodline; including Mrs. O'Neil. In her adult years she had fall in love with and married an Irish scientist by the name of Kirby O'Neil. She was eventually captured and experimented on by the Krang while she was pregnant with April. As a result, her daughter was born a human/Krang hybrid mutant; possessing an array of exceptionally powerful psychic abilities, as a result of her Krang DNA. When April was six years old, the Krang came for her. While her husband was able to escape to New York City, Mrs. O'Neil was recaptured and "put into stasis." One decade later (in Episode 55 "Buried Secrets"), she was discovered by the Turtles, Casey Jones, and her teenage daughter. She explained how her whole family's difficulties with the Krang raged on for many years, and seemed happy to be reunited with her daughter. She wondered of Kirby's whereabouts, to which the Turtles assured her that he was "on a safari in Puerto Rico." She attracted the suspicions of the sharp and intuitive Michelangelo, who planned to expose her true motives by any means. She was later revealed to be a clone of the real Mrs. O'Neil as an infiltration experiment infused with the human DNA of the real Mrs. O'Neil and Krang DNA; thus having only her memories. April expressed her sadness at losing her family all over again, even if it truly was not her mother, and wondered if she was indeed gone forever or was still alive somewhere. A family photograph of her, alongside her husband and infant daughter, was shown in "The Krang Conspiracy" which had been kept by Jack Kurtzman. She was first referenced by April in "Karai's Vendetta." April mentioning the tragic loss of her mother as a child, caused Karai to feel sympathy for April, as she, too had lost and never knew her own mother, Tang Shen.

In the IDW Comics, April's mother was named Elizabeth O'Neil, to whom was a journalist (similar to April's status as a reporter from various TMNT media adaptations). Elizabeth was first introduced when April, the Turtles, Casey, and Splinter were forced to flee New York to their home in Northampton. While April and Casey worked on keeping the Turtles and Splinter a secret, Elizabeth showed having some knowledge of the mutagen due to her past career as a reporter. When the Foot Clan tracked them down and attacked Elizabeth along with her husband John found out about the existence of the Turtles and Splinter. After the group fled, Elizabeth used a part of the mutagen April left behind to help heal John from his stroke due to its healing properties. Afterwards, the two moved to New York and took up residence in the Second Time Around store, where they maintain a good relationship with their daughter and her other friends, where they also allowed Casey to stay with them due to issues he has with his father.

Justice Force
The Justice Force is a superhero team that was around during the Golden Age.

First appearing in Mirage Comics issue "Dome Doom," the Turtles and Casey meet the older versions of the Justice Force in Northampton at the time when their former member Doctor Dome attacked them with his Domeoids. The fight ended when Battlin' Bernice named Ananda showed up to chastise Doctor Dome for ruining her mother's life. Stainless Steel Steve broke up the argument and offered Doctor Dome a redemption which he took. When Lilith swore vengeance on Shadow Jones for the death of Sloan, April and Casey asked Stainless Steel Steve and Metal Head to help Splinter watch over their stepdaughter.

In the 2003 TV series, the Justice Force first appears in the episode "Return of the Justice Force." The Turtles and Casey head to Northampton where they enter Steve's comic book store to look for a lost issue that would've helped Michelangelo know the fate of Battlin' Bernice. They meet the Justice Force when Doctor Dome started using his Domeoids to abduct them. It was soon discovered that Doctor Dome's secret daughter with Battlin' Bernice named Ananda was behind this where she wanted revenge on the Justice Force for letting her mother die. When Ananda was defeated, Doctor Dome reconciled with his daughter and also reconciled with Stainless Steve Steel. In later episodes, Ananda and Metal Head formed a second incarnation of the Justice Force that consisted of Silver Sentry, Chryalis, and Tsunami with Stainless Steel Steve in an advisor role and Zippy Lad training the new recruits. Their membership was later expanded with Nobody, Raptarr, and Nano in the episode "Membership Drive" while also gaining Michelangelo as the Turtle Titan. The episode "Super Power Struggle" revealed another former member called the Green Mantle who lost his powered cape in a battle and was found by Raphael during the fight with Dr. Malignus. The Justice Force are among the allies of the Turtles who assist them in the fight against the Demon Shredder's forces. When Dr. Malignus was defeated, the security guard at the convention turned out to be Green Mantle's true identity of Al Gordon who reclaims the special cape and rejoins the Justice Society. The Justice Force are among those who attended April and Casey's wedding and helped to fight the Cyber-Shredder.

Stainless Steel Steve
Stainless Steel Steve is the leader of the Justice Force who gets his name from the round metallic saucer on his head which can smash through anything.

In Mirage Comics, Stainless Steel Steve and Doctor Dome competed for the love of Battlin' Bernice. In the present, Stainless Steel Steve runs a comic book store with Metal Head as the stock boy when Doctor Dome began to target his old teammates. When Ananda came into view and broke up the fight, Stainless Steel Steve offered Doctor Dome a chance at redemption.

Stainless Steel Steve appears in the 2003 cartoon voiced by David Wills impersonating Adam West. During the Justice Force's fight with Doctor Dome, Michelangelo mentioned that Stainless Steel Steve once saved Doctor Dome from the Living Volcano and Doctor Dome once cured Stainless Steel Steve of the creeping alien rust. When Ananda was defeated and had reconciled with Doctor Dome, Stainless Steel Steve thanked the Turtles and Casey Jones for their help and even made Michelangelo an honorary member of the Justice Force. In "Super Power Struggle," Stainless Steel Steve appeared in an advisor role to the second incarnation of the Justice Force at the time when Raphael found the Green Mantle's powered cape. Following Dr. Malignus' defeat, Stainless Steel Steve picked up Al Gordon from the hospital and reunited with the Justice Force while reclaiming his cape.

Metal Head
Metal Head is a synthetic and dwarfish member of the Justice Force who can harden his hair to be used for weapons and change the physiology of his form. When Stainless Steel Steve opened his comic book store, Metal Head worked as the stock boy.

Metal Head appears in the 2003 cartoon voiced by Wayne Grayson. He is the first Justice Force member to be abducted by the Domeoids when the attack Steve's comic book store.

Joey Lastic
Joey Lastic is an elastic member of the Justice Force.

Joey Lastic appears in the 2003 cartoon voiced by Oliver Wyman. He has been shown to have trouble retracting his extending arms.

Zippy Lad
Zippy Lad is a member of the Justice Force with super-speed. In his old age, he can still move fast in his electronic wheelchair.

Zippy Lad appears in the 2003 cartoon voiced by Andrew Rannells in the first two appearances and by Sean Schemmel in the third appearance. In "Membership Drive," Zippy Lad was seen training the Justice Force's new recruits.

Doctor Dome
Doctor Dome is a dome-headed member of the Justice Force with genius-level intellect who can control his robots called Domeoids.

In Mirage Comics, he and Stainless Steel Steve competed for the love of Battlin' Bernice. When the Justice Force disbanded, Doctor Dome had a falling out with them. Years later, Doctor Dome started targeting the Justice Foce members to draw out Battlin' Bernice which also brought him into conflict with the Turtles and Casey Jones. When Battlin' Bernice's daughter Ananda shows up to break up the fight, she chasitizes him. Stainless Steel Steve offered Doctor Dome a chance at redemption which he accepted.

Doctor Dome appears in the 2003 TV series voiced by Stuart Zagnit. He was suspected of being behind the abductions of the Justice Force. When Doctor Dome clashed with Stainless Steel Steve, Michelangelo tried to get them to remember the times when they worked together while mentioning that Stainless Steel Steve saved Doctor Dome from the Living Volcano and that Doctor Dome once cured Stainless Steel Steve of the creeping alien rust. It is then discovered that Doctor Dome's secret daughter Ananda was behind this where she wanted revenge on the Justice Force for letting her mother die. The Turtles threw off Ananda's concentration on the Domeoids in order to defeat her. Doctor Dome then reconciled with Ananda. Michelangelo recapped to Joey Lastic that the strategy to defeat Ananda was the same one the Justice Force used to defeat the Grim Repo in issue #57 when he gained control of Doctor Dome's brain.

Ananda
Ananda is the daughter of Battlin' Bernice who inherited her mother's super-strength.

In Mirage Comics, Ananda shows up to interrupt the fight between Doctor Dome, the Justice Force, the Turtles, and Casey Jones where she chasitizes him.

Ananda appears in the 2003 TV series voiced by Carrie Keranen. This version is the daughter of Battlin' Bernice and her secret father is Doctor Dome which caused her to inherit his powers as well. When her mother died, Ananda blamed her father and the Justice Force enough to control the Domeoids into abducting the Justice Force and framing her father. The Turtles were able to throw off Ananda's concentration on the Domeoids to defeat her. In later episodes, Ananda and Metal Head formed a second incarnation of the Justice Force.

Aka
Aka is the Oldest sibling of the Pantheon in the IDW comics.

Gothano
Gothano is a member of the Pantheon and is more quite than his siblings and is the keeper of knowledge.

Toad Baron
Toad Baron is a member of the Pantheon who wants to make parties for both mortals and immortals to enjoy.

Neutrinos
The Neutrinos are a race of Extra-dimensional beings from Dimension X. They first appeared in the 1987 series as a group of elf like aliens a trait which is carried over to the Archie and IDW comics.

A group of Neutrinos appear in the 2012 series but with a different design and as antagonists.

The Neutrinos appear as cameo characters in the 2022 beat-'em-up Teenage Mutant Ninja Turtles: Shredder's Revenge.

Al'Falqa
Al'Falqa is a mutant falcon from an unnamed city in Saudi Arabia who is exclusive to the "Teenage Mutant Ninja Turtles Adventures" comics. Al'Falqa encounters the Turtles when they were travelling in Saudi Arabia. They helped Al'Falqa protect the mysterious Black Stone which was about to be stolen by Shredder and Verminator-X.

Punk Frogs
The Punk Frogs are a group of mutant frogs who are the counterparts of the Ninja Turtles.

In the 1987 series, the Punk Frogs are created by Shredder when mutagen landed in their part of the swamp. Shredder convinced them that he was a good guy and to be his warriors where he named them after would-be conquerors and dictators. Shredder trained them to fight the Turtles whom he had convinced the frogs into believing were bad guys. Each of the frogs were named after Shredder's own "heroes". After the Turtles saved them from being captured by Captain Hoffman, they realized that the Turtles were good guys and that the Shredder was a bad guy and broke ties with him. Afterward, the frogs became friends with the Turtles, with Attila emerging as the group's leader. They may even be described as having the character traits of the Ninja Turtles.

In Ninja Turtles: Superman Legend the Punk Frogs (except Napoleon Bonafrog) make a cameo.

In the 2012 series, the Punk Frogs were created by mutagen poured into their pond near the O'Neil family farmhouse by Mrs. O'Neil's Krang clone. Besides Attila, Genghis, Napoleon, and Rasputin, there are a substantial number of Frog Soldiers working for them. Evidently remembering the actions of humans in destroying their swamps to make room for cities, they swore revenge upon them, and briefly considered the Turtles brothers in need of liberation until learning that they were friends with April and Casey. Afterwards, the Punk Frogs

In the comic series published by IDW, the Punk Frogs are a faction in Mutant Town ever since Old Hob's mutagen bomb went off in a part of New York City. Besides Atilla, Genghis, Napoleon, and Rasputin, there are other members of the group consisting of Bloody Mary, Bonnie, Clyde, and Zetian. The Turtles came into conflict with them when the Punk Frogs thought that one of the Turtles kidnapped Bonnie. When the Turtles claimed that they didn't do it during the attack, they also claimed that it must've been some other mutant turtle that was the culprit. Clyde and the Turtles find that Dr. Jasper Barlow cobbled Bonnie together with a prosthetic shell that was implanted with a dragon scale and other turtle-like parts where he called her "Venus". After Dr. Barlow was thwarted, Clyde took Bonnie's original arms back to the Punk Frogs where he informed them that Bonnie is "dead" and that the Turtles weren't responsible.

The Punk Frogs appear as cameos in the 2022 beat-'em-up Teenage Mutant Ninja Turtles: Shredder's Revenge.

Attila the Frog
Atilla the Frog is a member of the Punk Frogs. He is named after Attila the Hun. He is armed with a spike ball and chain.

In Mutant Turtles: Superman Legend, Attila makes a cameo.

In the 2012 cartoon Attila the Frog (voiced by Maurice LaMarche impersonating Marlon Brando) is the leader of the group. Much of his behavior was a nod to Brando's characters in The Godfather and Apocalypse Now.

In the IDW comics, Attila is the tall leader of the Punk Frogs, wields a morningstar, and is very protective of the group.

Genghis Frog
Genghis Frog is a member of the Punk Frogs. He is named after Genghis Khan.

In the 1987 cartoon, Genghis Frog (voiced by Jim Cummings) is a Punk Frog that is armed with an axe.

In Mutant Turtles: Superman Legend, Genghis makes a cameo.

In the 2012 cartoon, Genghis Frog (voiced by Kevin Michael Richardson) served as the General of the Frog Soldiers.

In the IDW comics, Genghis Frog is a tall member of the Punk Frogs with a fierce personality and wields an axe.

Napoleon Bonafrog
Napoleon Bonafrog is a member of the Punk Frogs. He is named after Napoleon Bonaparte.

In the 1987 cartoon, Napoleon Bonafrog (voiced by Pat Fraley in most appearances, Townsend Coleman in "Napoleon Bonafrog: Colossus of the Swamps") is a Punk Frog that is armed with a whip. Though normally the Turtles ally, he was once transformed into a hulking slave of Krang and Shredder.

In the 2012 cartoon, Napoleon Bonafrog (voiced by Jon Heder who played the title role in Napoleon Dynamite) is depicted as a clumsy frog disliked by his brethren, which leads to his befriending Michelangelo. Much of his behavior was a nod to Heder's character in Napoleon Dynamite.

In the IDW comics, Napoleon is a tall and well-built member of the Punk Frogs and wields a whip.

Rasputin the Mad Frog
Rasputin the Mad Frog is a member of the Punk Frogs. He is named after Grigori Rasputin.

In the 1987s cartoon, Rasputin the Mad Frog (voiced by Nicholas Omana) is a Punk Frog that is armed with a bow and arrow.

In Mutant Turtles: Superman Legend, Rasputin makes a brief cameo.

In the 2012 cartoon, Rasputin the Mad Frog (voiced by Maurice LaMarche) is the adviser to Attila the Frog.

In the IDW comics, Rasputin is a bulky member of the Punk Frogs with a reasonable personality and wields a crossbow.

Renet Tilley
Renet Tilley is a rather reluctant, spoiled, and impulsive teenager whose parents, also denizens of the 79th Level, hoped that apprenticing her to Lord Simultaneous would help her develop some kind of common sense. Curious and impatient as she was, she did not care very much for studying. Renet first met the Turtles fooling around, when one day out of boredom she snatched her master's Time Scepter and was caught by him. She replied immediately and time-traveled off with Lord Simultaneous' Sceptre of the Sands of Time to Earth - more specifically to 1986 New York City. Renet and the Turtles became friends, but Simultaneous appeared and sent Renet into a panic. Fleeing Simultaneous further, she and the Turtles went to 1406 A.D., straight into a castle siege. The castle belonged to the dark mage Savanti Romero, a former, but exiled student of Simultaneous, and the besiegers were the soldiers of Cerebus, who was after some scrolls, that Romero had stolen. Romero also managed to grab the Time Scepter, and the Turtles and Renet had to contend with Cerebus' help to attack the castle and get the Sceptre back from Savanti Romero. The force was no match for Romero's magic. Before it came to the worst, Simultaneous appeared. Romero attacked Lord Simultaneous who took the Time Scepter again and cast Savanti into prehistoric times. He handed the scrolls to Cerebus, sent the Turtles back again to their time, and sent Renet to wipe dust in his huge library to. Later, she assists the Turtles in defeating Savanti Romero in prehistory when Romero plans to alter the Earths orbit and prevent the asteroid impact that wiped out the dinosaurs, meaning humanity, and mutant Turtles, will never exist. After defeating Romero, the group is stranded in prehistory for several months after the Scepter is lost in the ocean, but it is eventually recovered. Renet makes a third appearance saving the Turtles from Romero's demonic bride, Juliet Romero. This time she appears as a deity-like woman with full control over her time manipulating powers.

In the 2003 cartoon, Renet (voiced by Liza Jacqueline) undergone some minor changes in her backstory, where she is shown to be quite a scatterbrained person who came to her friends with good intentions, but with little practical skill she caused some problems across space and time. This leads to her transporting herself and the Turtles back to the medieval age to which Savanti Romero was banished, which resulted in the loss of the Time Scepter to Ultimate Drako, the fused form of the Ultimate Ninja and Drako. It would later be recovered and entrusted to Renet again, leading to another encounter with Romero in the Cretaceous Period. She would later appear at April and Casey's wedding, watching from a distance.

In the IDW comics, Renet has her debut in a special story, where she "invites" the Turtles to the interdimensional Battle Nexus tournament. In this version she is also Lord Simultaneous' pupil in magic, dimension travel, and apparently his successor in the Dimensional Council. At the time in which she appears for the first time, the cruel Councilor Nieli hosted a series of merciless gladiator fights, which only he really liked. Renet was also against the games for personal motives, because one of the champions, the warrior Baltizar, had won her heart. For this reason, they brought the Turtles to the hub of the dimensions and helped the culmination of these events to instigate an uprising against Nieli which meant that Nieli was banished and the games were transformed into a far more peaceful affair.

In the 3D CG the 2012 cartoon, Renet (voiced by Ashley Johnson) is a young immature timestress from the future who, like Michelangelo, makes rash decisions that sometimes gets her and others into trouble. She is also becomes the object of Michelangelo's affections. After taking her master's time scepter to keep it out of the hands of mutant time master Savanti Romero, she traveled back in time to get help from the Ninja Turtles. She ended up banishing Savanti to the Middle Ages, but was forced to pursue him to preserve history. This eventually got Renet and the Turtles to lose the scepter to Savanti, but after a series of conflicts, they recovered it. However, while traveling them back to their present, she lost the Turtles to sixteen-years-prior Tokyo, Japan, due to the mystical time scepter taking matters into its own hands. After six months from her perspective, she was able to locate them and return them to the twenty-first century. In the fifth and final season of the show, "When Wolds Collide, Part One" a hologram of her is first seen in Michelangelo's room. She appears to still keep in touch with the Turtles, particularly Mikey, who still has a crush on her. In the Monstrous Tales saga (consisting of four episodes "The Curse of Savanti Romero", "The Crypt of Dracula", "The Frankenstein Experiment" and "Monsters Among Us!") Renet returns to 21st century New York City, once again needing the Ninja Turtles help in stopping her Savanti Romero from making an unbeatable army of the undead by traveling back to the ancient past, to the time when Dr. Frankenstein began his monstrous scientific experiments.

Tattoo
Tattoo is a sumo wrestler whose tattoos can be used as weapons.

In the Teenage Mutant Ninja Turtles episode "Planet of the Turtleloids" Pt. 1, Tattoo (voiced by Rob Paulsen) was not a human being at all but a hamster mutated by the Shredder into human form. The Ninja Turtles encounter him vandalizing a pet shop. After a scuffle in which a confused angered Tattoo wraps himself up in electrical wire, he is electrocuted and reverted into hamster form. Leonardo deduces that Shredder kidnapped the hamster from that very same pet store and all he wanted was to return home.

In the Archie Comics he asked Splinter for a favor and requested that the TMNT rescue his chihuahua dog "Inky" from a group of Yakuza who wanted him to throw his next fight for gambling purposes. Tattoo states that he can't lose the match as it will ruin his career. The TMNT vow to help him get his pooch back without having to throw the match. While Tattoo is engaged in his Sumo match, the TMNT, Ninjara and the Warrior Dragon infiltrate the mob headquarters and rescue the feisty pup. Tattoo wins his match and the Turtles return Inky to his beloved master. The wrestler awards Leonardo a katana as thanks for saving his dog.

The Warrior Dragon
The Warrior Dragon debuted in the Fall 1990 issue of Teenage Mutant Ninja Turtles Magazine. He later returned in the Teenage Mutant Ninja Turtles Adventures comics series published by Archie Comics in 1991 as a New York City fireman named Chu Hsi. He was created by Mirage Studios artist Ryan Brown.

In 1992 Playmates Toys released an action figure of the Warrior Dragon named Hothead and cast in red plastic. Using the Hothead name, the character appeared in the NES version of Teenage Mutant Ninja Turtles: Tournament Fighters

Angel
Angel is supporting character in the 2003 series and later appearing in the IDW comics under the name Angel Bridge in the latter. Additionally in the IDW Comics, Angel served as the vigilante Nobody (a position notably held by a former police officer in the Mirage Comics and 2003 series versions) from an exo-suit created by the Turtle's ally Harold Lillja. In the Mirage Comics volume 3 by Image comics there is a female ninja named Angel who is one of Pimiko's minions.

Utroms
Utroms are a race of brain like aliens in the franchise they first appeared in the Mirage comics and had later appeared in the IDW comics. They also appear in the 2003 and 2012 series.
In the series Rise of the Teenage Mutant Ninja Turtles, one rogue member was revealed to be the creator of the armor worn by the Shredder, which many believed to be an Oni.

Klunk
Klunk is a stray ally cat Michaelango adopted and Klunk appears in the Mirage comics and the 2003 TV series. Klunk later appears in the IDW comics.

Cudley the Transdimensional Cowlick
Cudly the Transdimensional Cowlick is a giant cowhead with the ability to teleport and is an ally of the turtles. Cudly appeared in the Archies comics and later the IDW comics.

Antagonists

Foot Clan

The Foot Clan is an evil ninja organization that is usually run by the Shredder.

The Shredder

Shredder is the leader of the Foot Clan and arch-enemy of the Ninja Turtles.

Karai

Karai is a high-ranking member of the Foot Clan employed as Shredder's second-in-command and both an ally and enemy of the Ninja Turtles.

Baxter Stockman
Baxter Stockman is a mad scientist and human enemy of the Ninja Turtles, becoming employed by Shredder in most incarnations.

After creating the MOUSERS, with April O'Neil as his computer programmer, Stockman used them to commit strange bank robberies by allowing them to dig small tunnels leading into the vaults. April found out and tried to escape through the MOUSER factory elevator, but Stockman sent the elevator (with her still in it) down to the sewer level, where a squadron of MOUSERS were waiting to capture her. The Ninja Turtles saved her and successfully infiltrated the factory, stopping Stockman and leaving him in police custody. However, he escaped some time later and began using technology from DARPA to build a robot body for him to install his own brain into, making him a cyborg. Stockman tried getting revenge on the Turtles, but his new body was electrocuted and seemingly destroyed. Only his glasses remained.

In the 1987 cartoon, Stockman (voiced by Pat Fraley) was a misguided inventor who tried building his MOUSERS to the Ajax Pest Control company, but was told that it would only run them out of business and was kicked out of the building. Watching the whole scene through security cameras, Shredder approached him by offering him an even better job (which was accepted), first having Stockman create a master control device for the MOUSERS so that the Foot Clan could use them to destroy the Ninja Turtles. However, the Turtles destroyed these MOUSERS and found Stockman's name on one of them, thus leading them to confront him and escape in his van (which later became the Turtle Van). Following various incidents made by the Turtles during his service in the Foot that all ended with him getting abused by Shredder, Stockman was tasked to accompany Bebop and Rocksteady through an unstable portal to Dimension X to meet with Krang Prime. Krang Prime saw no use in his scientific expertise and decided to kill him by tossing him into a mutagen-powered disintegration chamber, which instead mutated Stockman into a mutant housefly due to letting a housefly land on his clothes and get tossed into the unit with him. Blaming the Turtles and Shredder, Stockman fled Dimension X to take his revenge but was convinced by Shredder that the Turtles alone were responsible for his mutation and took him back to the clan, promising to have him retro-mutated once they have the Turtles pay.

In the 2003 cartoon, Stockman runs a wealthy corporation on behalf of the Shredder, but when he begins failing his master due to the intervention of the Turtles, Stockman begins suffering brutal mutilation and torture at the hands of Hun as punishment. At the end of season 1, Stockman makes a play to kill Shredder and the Turtles, but is defeated when his enemies team up. Stockman is forced to rejoin the Shredder only to turn on him again early into Season 2. Stockman joins the New York mafia during the power vacuum after the Shredder's apparent death, but is conscripted once again and is tortured so severely that he is reduced to a brain and an eyeball attached to his spinal cord in a jar. During season 3, Stockman forms an uneasy alliance with Hun who has also been feeling the Shredder's wrath after too many failures, but decides to defect  Agent Bishop's Earth Protection Force. In Season 4, Stockman attempts to create a clone body for himself, but the body deteriorates and he subsequently dies after an encounter with the Turtles. However, Bishop resurrects him from the dead, much to his dismay. Stockman remained with Bishop until decades after the end of Season 7, in which he was presumably killed in a lab accident. Stockman survived until the year 2105 when he tried to take revenge on Bishop, who was now the president of Earth. However, he was convinced by the reformed Bishop as well as the Turtles, who had been transported into the future, to stand down and make peace. Bishop promised to help Stockman finally regain a healthy human body.

In the IDW comics, Stockman is the head of the StockGen company that created the Turtles and Splinter, who was tasked by Krang to experiment on mutagen.

In the 2012 cartoon, Stockman (voiced by Phil LaMarr) was a child prodigy who became evil due to being constantly bullied growing up. Stockman finds himself forcibly conscripted into the Foot Clan, and despite managing to flee on his own for a time, is brought back in by Dogpound and threatened with being mutated should he step out of line. Shredder later goes through with mutating him into a fly after deeming his work unsatisfactory, and the mutation destroys much of Stockman's sanity. Stockman has no choice but to swear loyalty to the Foot Clan as they are his best hope at being returned to normal. Stockman begins receiving more civil treatment from the Shredder as he begins serving full-time as his chief scientist, engineer, and medical officer. In his last appearance during the season 4 finale, the Turtles spare Stockman's life during their assault on the Shredder's compound and Michelangelo uses retro-mutagen on him, partially to stop his monologue and partly due to taking slight pity on him. However, Stockman is angry upon regaining his humanity and sanity, insisting he was stronger and more powerful as a mutant. This leads to Michelangelo knocking him out for being ungrateful for his de-mutation after complaining about being a fly in the episode he was mutated in.

In the 2022 beat-'em-up Teenage Mutant Ninja Turtles: Shredder's Revenge, Baxter Stockman is a mutated fly-human-hybrid mad scientist who assembles and activates Krang to fight against the turtles. He is given the parts of the Krang body by Bebop and Rocksteady and Tempestra, then gains the final piece when the destruction of Metalhead activated its appearance. He is chased down by the Turtles, April, Splinter, and Casey Jones, who fight him and knock him unconscious, though he activates Krang before he can be defeated.

Stockman will appear in the upcoming 2023 animated film Teenage Mutant Ninja Turtles: Mutant Mayhem, he is voiced by Giancarlo Esposito.

Bebop and Rocksteady

Bebop and Rocksteady are a mutant warthog and rhinoceros employed by Shredder and enemies of the Ninja Turtles.

Tatsu
Tatsu is a Foot Clan Warrior and the Shredder's second-in-command in Teenage Mutant Ninja Turtles, Teenage Mutant Ninja Turtles II: The Secret of the Ooze, and the 2012 animated series.

In the films Tatsu is a skilled martial artist who oversees the training of Shredder's army; he rarely speaks except to Shredder or to give orders to the Foot Ninja or those training to join the ranks. He leads the attack on April O'Neil's home in the first film, and later fights with Casey Jones at the Foot lair. Though initially overpowering the vigilante, he is defeated after Casey finds a golf club among the various stolen items stockpiled by the Foot and uses it to subdue Tatsu. In the second film he is shown to have escaped police custody, and attempts to take leadership of the Foot until the Shredder is revealed to be still alive. He leads the Foot Ninja who steal the mutagen from TGRI, and helps oversee the rebuilding of the Foot army; however, he is easily defeated near the end of the film by the Turtles all slamming their back shells into him.

In the 2012 animated series Tatsu was reintroduced as a blind swordsman, but still the Shredder's loyal underling; here he was in charge of the Foot Clan in Japan whenever the Shredder was absent, and also mentored Karai. After the death of the Super Shredder he came to New York to seize control of the remainder of the Foot Clan from Tiger Claw, only to face the Turtles and Karai and be opposed by Tiger Claw.

Despite being a minor character, Tatsu appears as a boss in Teenage Mutant Ninja Turtles: The Hyperstone Heist.

Tokka and Rahzar
Tokka and Rahzar are a mutant alligator snapping turtle and gray wolf employed by Shredder and enemies of the Ninja Turtles.

Tokka and Rahzar first appear in Teenage Mutant Ninja Turtles II: The Secret of the Ooze with Tokka face-performed by Rick Lyon, in-suit performed by Kurt Bryant, and voiced by Frank Welker while Rahzar is face-performed by Gord Robertson, in-suit performed by Mark Ginther, and also voiced by Frank Welker. As a snapping turtle and gray wolf abducted from the Bronx Zoo by the Foot Clan, Tokka and Rahzar were mutated into more intelligent humanoid forms by kidnapped TCRI professor Jordan Perry under Shredder's orders, but during the process, Perry secretly altered the mutagen with the DNA of human children. This eventually gave the duo childish personalities, thus humiliating Shredder by thinking the word "master" meant "mama". However, Perry had sympathy for them and showed Shredder their full obedience, thus convincing to keep them around. The duo even proved to be more than a match for the Ninja Turtles. After failing to stop them from rescuing Perry, Shredder had them cause destruction to an old neighborhood. The next day, Shredder had the Foot encounter April and have her deliver the Turtles a message telling them to meet the Foot Clan at a construction site near the docks or else Tokka and Rahzar will be sent out again. This time, they will be sent into Central Park. The Turtles note that Tokka and Rahzar won't avoid any people there. Perry had prepared a retro-mutagen for the Turtles to use, which retro-mutated both Tokka and Rahzar after a brief battle during a Vanilla Ice concert. The fate that followed the duo's retro-mutation remained unknown, but it's most likely that they could've been carted back to the zoo.

In the 1987 cartoon, Tokka (voiced by Rob Paulsen) and Rahzar (voiced by Townsend Coleman) were out-of-control alligator snapping turtle and gray wolf zoo exhibits mutated into their current mutant forms when Shredder infected their habitats. Following their first encounter with the Ninja Turtles at the Crystal Palace Mall, Tokka was captured by a mutant hunter and taken to Dirk Savage, leaving Rahzar to report back to Shredder. Rahzar made a big deal with Tokka's capture and went to fight Dirk alone, yet it was unclear of whether or not the duo was reunited following the rescue mission.

In the series finale of the 2003 cartoon titled "Turtles Forever", two Cyber Foot members are mutated into the 2003 incarnations of the characters and play a brief role as members of the Mutant Foot Soldiers.

In the 2012 cartoon, Tokka (vocal effects provided by different sound effects) and Rahzar (voiced by Clancy Brown) were introduced as Tokka Picasso, a monstrous female turtle-like alien assigned by the Utroms to guard the final piece of the Black Hole Generator, and Chris Bradford, a celebrity martial arts star who is a prized pupil of Shredder, owning chain of dojos across the country with their ninjutsu classes used for the purpose of recruiting Foot Ninjas.
 When Shredder learned of Splinter's presence in New York, he sent by Bradford to find and kill both him and the Ninja Turtles, first tricking Michelangelo into a faux friendship on a social media website. Bradford revealed his deception when he had Michelangelo captured, sparking a bitter hatred from him. However, after he failed to trick the Turtles into leading him and the Foot to Splinter and numerous repeated failures, Shredder became enraged at his incompetence. During a fight with the Turtles, Bradford and Xever were doused with mutagen, and as a result of being earlier bitten in the knuckles by Shredder's pet akita, Hatchiko, Bradford mutated into an 8 ft. humanoid mutant akita with a spiked back, a large left arm, heightened senses and superhuman strength simply dubbed Dogpound. However, he hated his larger, clumsier form. Dogpound was later mutated into a near-skeletal werewolf-like version of his previous form with more agility, which he found more acceptable. Being given the new name Rahzar by Michelangelo, Rahzar continued to serve the Shredder until his death at the hands of Leatherhead towards the end of the fourth season. Rahzar was resurrected by the demon Kavaxas in the fifth season, only to be revealed to be serving as Kavaxas's puppet. Rahzar fell into the Netherworld during Kavaxas's attack on the mortal realm, never to return.
 Tokka, on the other hand, attempted to recover the Black Hole Generator piece from when Lord Dregg was able to steal it. However, the piece was seemingly destroyed by the explosion of a dwarf star triggered by the Triceratons, though Tokka's son Chompy survived and remained with the Turtles. Tokka subsequently was revealed to have survived the ordeal and ventured to Earth to collect her son but decided to allow him to stay with Raphael after realizing he was in good hands with him. Tokka departed Earth, though Raphael conceded that one-day Chompy would have to return to the stars with his mother.

In the comic series published by IDW, Tokka and Rahzar appear as two of Old Hob's mutant creations. He was to sell them as "recruits" to Karai and the Foot Clan.

Kitsune

Kitsune is an ancient Japanese witch who is allied with the Shredder. She is the youngest member of her family the pantheon and the sister of Rat King her goal was to resurrect her father the Dragon to untie her family and destroy humanity in the process. She and Shredder are lovers as shown by their sincere affection towards one another.

Shredder Elites
The Shredder Elites are the elite squads of the Shredder in the Mirage and IDW comics. The Shredder Elite also appears in the 2003 series.

Foot Mystics
The Foot Mystics are Foot Ninjas that mastered the art of Magic they first appeared in the 2003 series and later in the Mirage series.

Foot Brute
The Foot Brute is a member of the Foot in the Rise of the Teenage Mutant Ninja Turtles.

Khan
Khan is a member of the Foot in the 2003 series.

Oroku Nagi
Oroku Nagi is the older brother of the Shredder in the Mirage Comics.

Lin
Lin is a female member of the Foot Clan in the Mirage comics.

Pimiko
Pimiko is the daughter of Shredder from the Mirage Comics.

Koya
Koya is a mutant brown falcon.

In the IDW comics, Koya was the pet brown falcon of the Shredder who was used for reconnaissance. Following the "City Fall" storyline in the IDW Comics, Koya later mutated into a humanoid form. She ambushes the Turtles and their friends at April's parents' farmhouse during the Northampton storyline. Koya is expressive and is excited and eager to hunt down her prey.

Bludgeon
Bludgeon is a mutant hammerhead shark who appeared in the IDW comic "Teenage Mutant Ninja Turtles" issue 37. He was created by the Shredder and used alongside Koya as the contingency plan to attack Krang while in the Atlantic Ocean aboard Krang's ship in the event that a deal can't be made between Shredder and Krang.

Natsu
Natsu is a young woman who was originally a part of the Yakuza until Karai took over.

Ocho
Ocho is a female Yokai mole who was guarding a magical sword.

Cha Ocho
Cha Ocho is a member of the Foot in the Mirage Comics.

Shredder Clones
The Shredder Clones are the Clones of the Shredder. They consist of:

 Claw Shredder - A clone of Shredder with crustacean-like claws.
 Mini-Shredder - A small clone with a wrist blade on each arm.
 Shiva Shredder - A hulking brute with four arms.

The Shredder Clones first appeared in the Mirage Comics. Shredder claims that they were created through a combination of ancient magic, modern science, and a Paramecia Coloniex (a species of colony worms created by the Foot Clan) where they turned the remains of someone into a replica of said person while claiming that the Paramecia Coloniex fed on Oroku Saki's charred remains

The Shredder Clones appear in the 2003 series. They were referred to as Mutant Shredder Clones where they were kept in liquid vats within the Foot Clan's headquarters. They resembled the Shredder more where the Claw Shredder was less crustacean-like. The Turtles and Splinter fought them where the Claw Shredder was emerging from the rubble and the Mini-Shredder and Shiva Shredder were last seen on top of a falling elevator. Their fates after that were unknown.

The Shredder Clones appear in the 2012 series with their vocal effects provided by Kevin Michael Richardson. They were referred to as the Shredder Mutants where they were created by Baxter Stockman through a combination of Shredder's DNA and different crustaceans. The Claw Shredder has the claws and tail of a lobster. The Mini-Shredder has the whiskers and tail of a shrimp. The Shiva Shredder has a crab-like shell. They are first seen in "Return to New York" where they served as the guards to Stockman-Fly's laboratory. The Turtles fought them and Stockman-Fly during a mission to rescue Splinter. Once Splinter regained his mind, he defeated the Shredder Mutants by knocking them towards the fan beneath the mutation device. In "Attack of the Mega Shredder", Leonardo and Michelangelo sneak into Stockman-Fly's lab to obtain some Brain Worms and are caught by Rocksteady, Bebop, and the Shredder Mutants. When Rocksteady and Bebop planned to mutate the Turtles, Leonardo states that they should mutate more animals. This causes Rocksteady and Bebop to dump the Shredder Mutants into the mutagen vat which fused them into a gigantic blob-like super-mutant with many eyes, mouths, and spikes that was dubbed Mega-Shredder (vocal effects provided by Kevin Michael Richardson) as it goes on a rampage in New York. When the Mega-Shredder's young Oroku Saki-like tongue was cut off by the Turtles due to it serving as the brain, the Mega-Shredder dies.

Krang

Krang is an alien warlord that comes from Dimension X in several incarnations of the series, while the 2012 cartoon series featured them as a race – here called the Kraang – who sought to conquer Earth for use as a colony world. Something similar was done for the Rise Movie in 2022.

Lord Dregg
Lord Dregg is an evil alien warlord first introduced in the 1987 TV series (voiced by Tony Jay) where he replaced Shredder and Krang as the main antagonist for the final two seasons. Dregg also appears in the 2012 TV series as Vrinigath Dregg (voiced by Peter Stormare), a criminal insectoid creature and ruler of the planet Sectoid 1 who is considered as the lord of all insects in the universe and serves as one of the main antagonists of the first half of season 4 and also appears in season 5.

Hi-Tech
Hi-Tech, occasionally referred to as the Hi-Tech, is a humanoid Arthropod alien and Dregg's second in command. As his name would imply, Hi-Tech is always seen with advanced alien armor and weaponry.

Hi-Tech appeared in the 1987 series voiced by Rob Paulsen and Cam Clarke. Hi-Tech is extremely loyal to Dregg's, assisting Dregg in his plans to conquer Earth or destroy the Turtles. However, in the beginning of the tenth season Dregg decides his other subordinate, Mung, is more useful and has Hi-Tech shot into space.

Purple Dragons

The Purple Dragons are a street gang that is documented to have connections with the Foot Clan in few incarnations and have clashed with the Ninja Turtles in several series.

They first appeared in the Mirage comics as the toughest gang from the Lower East Side in New York City. They often are led by Hun and have a connection to the Foot Clan, though not always. The leader of the "Black Dragons", apparently cut a deal with Officer Miller, which resulted in Hun being locked up and allowed him to gain control of the Purple Dragons. He then helped the Purple Dragons' one-time-rival Shredder wipe out the group, turning them into the Black Dragons: a gang subservient to the Foot Clan. In their first fight against the Teenage Mutant Ninja Turtles, the Purple Dragons found that their guns and knives are useless against their martial arts. The turtles managed to kill most of the members before the police arrive. The Purple Dragons appear again 25 years later in 2009. Decades ago, the gang's leader Hunter Mason (the true identity of Hun) delivered a brutal beating to a teen-aged Casey Jones, one of the Purple Dragons' bitterest enemies, prior to being thrown in jail. After being released from jail Hun wiped out the Black Dragons, declaring his intentions to rebuild his criminal empire.

In the IDW comics, the Purple Dragons are led by Angel Bridge. Unlike the other incarnations, the Purple Dragons are a "community watch" where they do not like mutants or ninjas from the Foot Clan causing trouble on their turf. Angel's father Brooklyn S. Bridge and Arnold Jones (who is the identity of Hun in this continuity) had formerly used the Purple Dragons where their activities made the streets of Brooklyn unsafe. The leadership of the Purple Dragons was wrested from Angel by force by a resurrected Hun. As a result, the Purple Dragons reverted to their former existence as a violent street gang.

In the 2003 Teenage Mutant Ninja Turtles TV series, the Purple Dragons are led by Hun and have connections with the Foot Clan. Following the Shredder's exile from Earth by the Utroms and the discovery that Shredder was an Utrom named Ch'rell, Hun began to strengthen the Purple Dragons, developing them from just a street gang to a country-wide organized crime syndicate. They began to steal illegal goods (particularly high tech Triceratons and Federation weaponry from the government), but accidentally brought a mutant called Finn. Hun also broke his previous connection with the Foot Clan to spread their influence in the city. The Purple Dragons were among those who helped the Teenage Mutant Ninja Turtles fight the Tengu Shredder's forces.

In the 2012 Teenage Mutant Ninja Turtles cartoon, the Purple Dragons are a Chinese American gang who have connections with the Foot Clan.

In the 2018 Rise of the Teenage Mutant Ninja Turtles cartoon, the Purple Dragons are a trio of snobby, tech club students at April's high school who use their skills for criminal acts, similar to Team Rocket trios from Pokémon. They are rivals with the Turtles, especially Donatello from how they both use technology.

Hun
Hunter "Hun" Mason is the leader of the Purple Dragons featured in the 2003 animated series.

Hun (voiced by Greg Carey) was an exceptionally large, muscular Caucasian with blonde hair that he wore in a ponytail and Purple Dragon and Foot tattoos on his arms. Having served as a lieutenant to the Shredder and the leader of the Purple Dragons for years, he served as a recurring foe of the Turtles and a personal nemesis for Casey Jones, having set fire to a store owned by Casey's father and killing him. Despite great strength and impressive fighting ability, he constantly failed to defeat the Turtles, and was eventually replaced in his master's esteem by the Shredder's adopted daughter Karai. Despite this, Hun remained firmly loyal to his master until he learned that the Shredder was actually an Utrom who appeared human through the use of an exo-suit. He subsequently broke ties with the Foot Clan and became the full-time leader of the Purple Dragons. Subsequently, the Turtles convinced Hun to join their alliance against the Demon Shredder. After they disappeared into the future for a year, Hun claimed to have killed them and wore replicas of their weapons as trophies. His lie was exposed upon their return, but Hun soon had larger problems: namely, a reformed Foot Clan under the leadership of a digital clone of the Utrom Shredder who sought to emerge from the digital world into the real world. The Turtles managed to defeat this Cyber Shredder. In Turtles Forever, an encounter with an alternate set of turtles (from the universe of the 1980s cartoon series) resulted in Hun mutating into what he hated most...a mutant turtle himself. He joined forces with the returned Utrom Shredder and his 80s' counterpart to get revenge on the Turtles, but disappeared when his returned master attempted to wipe the Turtles from existence and nearly destroyed the multiverse in the bargain. The multiverse and everyone that was wiped out was subsequently restored.
 
Hun was subsequently included into the Mirage comic line. As a young man, he and his gang burned down Casey's father auto shop, which caused Casey to go one on one against him. With his incredible strength, Hun nearly beat Casey to death in front of his mother until Casey managed to pull out a knife and stab him in his left neck, causing his left eye to go permanently blind. As a result, Hun flew into a rage and lifted Casey and slammed him face first, which put Casey in a deep coma and on life support causing him several mental disorders. One of his old men sold him out to the cops causing him to go to jail. When he got out, he found that his gang had become the "Black Dragons," a gang working for the Foot. Hun wiped out the Black Dragons and began to rebuild his criminal empire.

In the IDW comics, Hun is the former alias of Arnold Jones, who in his youth was a member of the Purple Dragons, until a girl he met brought him back to an honest life. After her death, Arnold started to abuse his son Casey in a drunken stupor, which eventually led Casey to his new friends, the Turtles, who accepted him into their family. As Casey was seriously injured by the Shredder in the course of his adventures with his new family and Arnold found out about it, he came to the newfound concern for his son and was finally brought back to his senses. When in the hospital bathroom, he ripped off his shirt and punched a bathroom mirror vowing never to drink alcohol again. Ironically upon Arnold being brought to him by Dark Leonardo, the Shredder (the man who had hurt Casey) offered Arnold the chance to pay for his son's medical bills when Arnold himself would become Hun again and be in his service, an offer which because of his son he finally accepted. He was rejuvenated by a serving of a mutagen-laced steroid. Following the Shredder's death, he attempts to reconcile with Casey, leading to several moments of tense cooperation in the face of a common crisis. However, after Jennika's mutation, Hun resumed his strong distaste towards mutants as they had indirectly wrecked his family's relationships, and later joins forces with Agent Bishop due to their common hatred towards mutants, but ultimately dies while saving his son.

In the 2012 cartoon, Hun (voiced by Eric Bauza) is the new Chinese leader of the often-defeated Purple Dragons bearing a resemblance to Bruce Lee and possessing considerable martial arts skill. Like Fong (who was the unofficial leader before Hun came along), Hun is loyal to the Shredder and a foe to Casey Jones. His presence apparently earned Shredder control over New York's Asian street gangs and Hun went to great lengths to ingratiate himself further with his new master.

Rat King

The Rat King is a more enigmatic enemy or even ally of the Ninja Turtles, with an apparent telepathic influence over rats.

As a scarred and heavily bandaged patient at a local hospital, the unnamed man who would later be known as the Rat King was chosen to take the place of a member of a group of beings, each with jurisdiction over a different animal species, known as the Pantheons (the one with jurisdiction over rats). Eventually going renegade on them, he resided in a swamp for several months before venturing to a nearby abandoned industrial park and using it as a shelter for the oncoming winter. However, it was there that he happened upon the Ninja Turtles and Casey Jones and, believing them to be other "monsters" who wish to take his territory (though they were actually there to train), Rat King stalked them around the park, eventually capturing Michelangelo and trying to feed him to the rats in the process. Michelangelo later escaped, and Rat King was defeated in a duel by Leonardo, who knocked him off balance and sent him plummeting into the bowels of a silo. Sometime later, Splinter journeyed to the silo and began having visions of Rat King appearing before him as a demonic rat-like entity. Telling Splinter to devour a rat to regain his strength, Rat King also stated that he has been waiting for him to come for a long time. However, when Splinter went down into the silo two months later, all he saw (much to his surprise) was Rat King's decaying corpse.

In the 1987 cartoon, Rat King (voiced by Townsend Coleman) was a homeless man living in a dilapidated portion of the sewers near the Ninja Turtles and Splinter, who enacted a plot to establish his own rat-controlled government and bring human rule to an end, believing that rats (which he counted himself as) were superior to all the other species he described as "inferior non-rodents". He occasionally allied himself with other villains, but was depicted as somewhat an anti-hero on one occasion, when he helped the Turtles rescue a captured April O'Neil. Also, when not seeking to expand his rat empire, Rat King seemed content to simply remain underground with his loyal rats and realized it was more to his advantage to have the Turtles as allies than as enemies.

In the IDW comics, Rat King was the older brother of Kitsune, as both are members of an ancient immortal family that ruled Earth before mankind.

In the 2012 cartoon, Rat King (voiced by Jeffrey Combs) was introduced as Victor Falco, a scientist approached by the Krang to work on a neurochemical involving mutagen and chimpanzee DNA that allows him to read thoughts. Despite his colleague Tyler Rockwell's protests, Falco decided to test the chemical on him, mutating Rockwell into a humanoid mutant chimpanzee in the process. Rockwell escaped before Falco could even extract the chemical from him. As a result, Falco reported him missing, but the Ninja Turtles eventually discovered the truth after unwittingly returning Rockwell to him. Utilizing Splinter's earlier lesson about how to avoid thinking in a fight, Donatello defeated Falco and saved Rockwell, but Falco escaped before the Turtles could interrogate him about the Krang. While in hiding, he continued his research about the neurochemical in a rat-infested lab until one night, a couple of electrical wires that the rats gnawed on earlier fell into the chemical, triggering an explosive chain reaction that left Falco blind and disfigured but with mental control over rats. Now gaunt and corpse-like, Rat King tried to use his new psychic abilities to manipulate Splinter into fighting and killing his own turtle sons, but Splinter eventually shook off the mind control and defeated him. The Rat King would later resurface and use Splinter's knowledge of mutagen to create an army of mutant rats in the Undercity, the event resulting in the Rat King falling to his death. He made a final appearance in "Darkest Plight" as a fever-induced hallucination that torments Splinter before he finally defeats him and finds the Rat King's skeletal remains.

Rat King appears in the Super Nintendo version of Teenage Mutant Ninja Turtles: Tournament Fighters and as a boss in the 2022 beat-'em-up Teenage Mutant Ninja Turtles: Shredder's Revenge. His only appearance in an older game was in the SNES version of Turtles in Time, in which he uses an enhanced jet ski. This jet ski later appears in Shredder's Revenge, revealing Rat King had kept it for safekeeping.

Bishop
Agent John Bishop is the leader of the Earth Protection Force, a group dedicated to protecting Earth from extraterrestrial attack, in the 2003 animated series, voiced by David Zen Mansley. Originally a soldier in the War of 1812, he was abducted by aliens, which embittered him towards extraterrestrials and led him to start the EPF. Through unknown means (possibly the use of clones of himself created using alien technology) Bishop survived into modern times, and first came into conflict with the turtles when the D'Hoonib Federation and the Triceraton Republic brought their war to Earth. Having forged an alliance with the Federation, Bishop helped them secure the Fugitoid Professor Honeycutt in exchange for having the Turtles to examine. Bishop had previously captured and experimented upon the Turtles' friend Leatherhead, who had previously been thought deceased, and in examining him and the Turtles found their genetic mutations to hold great promise for his never-ending war with aliens. The Turtles and Leatherhead managed to escape his clutches and fought him, but Bishop's abilities proved impressive enough to enable his escape as well. Bishop would clash with the Turtles several times, notably kidnapping Shredder's adopted daughter Karai and Master Splinter, whose mutated rodent DNA proved to be the missing piece Bishop needed to finish his Slayer Project. The Slayers, genetically enhanced clones of Bishop himself, were intended to infiltrate the human populace and weed out aliens in disguise, with little regard for any innocents who might be claimed. However, the Turtles managed to destroy the Slayer project, with the only remaining specimen going renegade and reemerging as the Rat King.

Bishop would later return allied with Baxter Stockman, who helped him in his efforts to stop the Utrom Shredder Ch'rell from escaping into space. Stockman later became a permanent part of the EPF, providing Bishop with a new, enhanced clone body and creating an army of false aliens to attack New York to convince the President of the United States of the need for Bishop's organization. However, this show ended up backfiring, as the slime released by the destroyed "aliens" proved to have mutagenic properties that began turning various denizens of New York human and otherwise into mutants. Bishop would subsequently be contacted by a mysterious party who informed him of a crystal that would provide him valuable information for his research, but that was in the possession of the Foot Clan. When Leatherhead and the Turtles approached him for help with a mutated Donatello, Bishop agreed to devote his resources to the task if the Turtles would recover the crystal for him. Leatherhead managed to complete Bishop and Stockman's work on a cure, and the Turtles soon returned with the crystal. However, it would later be revealed that the party who contacted Bishop were the Foot Mystics, a band of demons enslaved by the Utrom Shredder and Karai but now freed thanks to Bishop destroying the crystal while attempting to glean information from it. Bishop and his forces would soon reap the consequences of this, as the Mystics revived the original Demon Shredder and led him to New York, from which he attempted to conquer the world. The EPF would be one of several groups, others being the Justice Force, Purple Dragons, and Karai's Foot Clan-to be gathered by the Turtles in order to do battle with the Demon Shredder's forces.

In the year 2105, the Turtles would surprisingly encounter Bishop again, only to find him as president of the Pan-Galactic Alliance between Earth and several alien worlds. Bishop would later reveal that in the time between the Turtles' departure from the past and their arrival in the future, he had continued his campaign against the aliens with Stockman's assistance. However, an accident at their lab resulted in Stockman's apparent demise, and Bishop was stunned when one of the many alien "specimens" he had held captive for so long saved his life. Realizing that he had judged all aliens based on the actions of a few, Bishop transformed the Earth Protection Force into the beginnings of the Pan-Galactic Alliance. He would call upon the Turtles a number of times during their stay in the future, most often dealing with the threat of Sh'Okanabo but also dealing with such threats as Torbinn Zixx. His past would later come back to haunt him in the form of Baxter Stockman, who survived the destruction of their lab and sought revenge on Bishop for abandoning him. However, when the fight between Baxter and the Turtles left Baxter in danger of expiring, Bishop demonstrated that he truly had changed by rescuing his old partner and subsequently offering him the chance for a new start. After the Turtles returned to the present, Bishop was among the observers of April and Casey's wedding. Bishop was to have appeared in additional storyline for the Fast Forward series, but it was discontinued in favor of Back to the Sewer.

A new version of the character, known simply as Bishop appears in the 2012 TV series, voiced by Nolan North. In this continuity, he is a member of the Utrom, a Krang tribe who broke free of the Krang hive mind and now seeks to protect the Earth from both the Krang and Triceraton threats. He is also the creator of the Krang android body copied and employed by the Krang to pass as humans, and only distinguishable from his imitators by a pair of sunglasses. While the Utrom maintain a code of noninvolvement in Earth affairs, Bishop breaks this and contacts the Turtles to warn them of the Technodrome's imminent relaunch and the impending Triceraton invasion. He then joins them and their allies in attacking the Technodrome in hopes of destroying it before the Triceratons arrive, and winds up confronting Krang Sub-Prime, whom he reveals was once an Utrom and refers to as "brother" and "Sub-Sub-Prime." Following the Triceratons' arrival he joins the Turtles in a failed assault on the Triceratons' black hole generator, only to have his body damaged to the point that he is forced to abandon it. He is not seen again prior to Earth's apparent destruction.

The Turtles later encounter Bishop again after Professor Honeycutt, the Fugitoid, takes them back in time six months in hopes of preventing the Triceratons from collecting the pieces of the black hole generator or Heart of Darkness. He is revealed to be an old friend of Honeycutt's, though he was unaware of the latter's transformation into a cyborg and a member of the Utrom Council, whose other colleagues are also named for chess pieces. On meeting with the Turtles to discuss the possibility of revealing the locations of the black hole generators components to them, Bishop and the others reveal the history of their race: their small group is all that remains free of Krang Prime's mind control, Krang having once been an Utrom scientist who mutated himself and enslaved the rest of their species. After learning of the negative effects of one of the fragments upon the Aeons, Bishop and his cohorts consider helping the Turtles, but their base is then attacked by their traitorous former colleague Krang Sub-Prime, whom Bishop reveals was once an Utrom hero named Knight. After Queen is captured, Bishop and the other Utroms declare war and join the Turtles in attacking the Sub Command Center. During the ensuing battle, Bishop engages his former brother in a duel and defeats him, after which Krang Sub-Prime is hit by a crashing Dracotroid that explodes. Bishop and the others then reveal where the remaining pieces of the generator were hidden. Bishop was later shown aiding the Earth Protection Force in dealing with the threat of Tokka.
Bishop appears in the Mirage comics in Tales of the Teenage Mutant Ninja Turtles Vol 2. #61 off-panel with his voice being heard

In the IDW Comics Bishop is more psychotic and xenophobic than his 2003 counterpart and is later to be revealed to be a deformed human with a short stature who wears a robotic suit.

Go Komodo
Go Komodo appears in volume 3 of the original comics, published by Image Comics. He's a powerful Japanese businessman with properties in New York who surrounds himself with the trappings of a feudal Japanese daimyo. He secretly has a curse that causes him to transform into a large Komodo dragon, and seeks the Turtles and Splinter to learn the secrets of the mutagen in their blood to gain control of the condition. To that end he hires cyborgs to assault the TMNT, setting into motion the events of the series.

King Komodo
King Komodo is a mutant Komodo dragon who was part of Go Komodo's menagerie before being accidentally mutated. He winds up biting off Leonardo's hand (which later grew back). He winds up turning on Go Komodo, killing him and taking his identity when he realizes he can transform into an identical appearance. He leaves to take over Go Komodo's Japanese operations on friendly terms with the turtles.

Savanti Romero
Savanti Romero is a former servant of Lord Simultaneous and an enemy of Renet. He appears in the Mirage and IDW Comics.

In the 2003 series, Romero appears in three episodes voiced by David Zen Mansley. He retains his Mirage backstory of being a transformed treacherous apprentice of Lord Simultaneous, and is first shown trying to capture the Time Scepter in Earth's Middle Ages. When foiled by the Turtles and Renet, Lord Simultaneous banished him further back in time to Earth's Cretaceous Period. Romero would serve as the main antagonist of the “Return of Savanti” two-parter in which he tries to avert the asteroid impact that would wipe out the dinosaurs, seeking to rule the Earth in a world where humanity never evolves. The Turtles and Renet once again defeated him, and this time Romero perished for good.

In the 2012 series, Romero is voiced by Graham McTavish and is much more comedic than his 2003 counterpart. As with his previous incarnations, he is defeated by the Turtles and Renet in Earth's Middle Ages and banished to the Cretaceous Period. However, he makes his way back to the present and begins traveling through time to build an army of monsters, bringing in the likes of Dracula, a mummy, a werewolf, and Frankenstein's monster. Romero enters a power struggle with Dracula who commands most of their forces, and agrees to an equal partnership with him. However, Dracula is killed during the final battle with the Turtles and Romero is returned to the Cretaceous Period, this time being killed by a dinosaur for good.

Null
Null is a demon that appears as an antagonist in the Archie Comics as Mr. Null while in the IDW comics Null is female.

Maligna
Maligna is the mother and queen of the Malignoids she appears as one of the antagonists of the Archie comics and later appears in the IDW comics.

Adversary
Adversary was a demon from the Mirage Comics.

Chi-You
Chi-You is a member of the Pantheon and was a villain in the Ghostbusters/TMNT crossover.

Triceratons

The Triceratons are recurring antagonists in the TMNT franchise. Traditionally, they are an alien race modelled after Triceratops, led by their emperor Zanramon.

Triceratons appear in the Fuigtoid mini-series before the Turtles until the Triceratons were added in the Mirage Comics.

The Triceratons appeared in only one episode in the 1987 series.

The Triceratons appeared in the Archie comics as recurring villains.

The Triceratons appear in the 2003 series as recurring villains.

The Triceratons later appeared in the 2012 series.

The Triceratons also appears in the IDW comics as mutants rather than aliens created by the Utroms.

A Triceraton made a brief appearance as one of the frozen victims of Krang in the 2016 film, Teenage Mutant Ninja Turtles: Out of the Shadows.

In Rise of the Teenage Mutant Ninja Turtles: The Movie (2022), Krang One's throne is in a giant triceratops-like skull, which director Andy Suriano confirmed belonged to a Triceraton.

An unnamed Triceraton appears as a boss in Teenage Mutant Ninja Turtles: Radical Rescue. This character appears again in the Genesis version of Tournament Fighters, as the first boss character. An original Triceraton character named Captain Zorax appears in Shredder's Revenge.

The Dragon
The Dragon is the All Father of the Pantheon and appears as a ghost in Karai's story. Kitsune seeks his revival to untie the Pantheon and would wipe out humanity in the progress.

Darius Dun
Darius Dun is one of the main villains of Fast Forward in the 2003 series and later a minor villain in the IDW comics.

In the "Fast Forward" series, Darius Dunn is the uncle, legal guardian, and only relative of Cody Jones who works as the CEO of O'Neil Tech following the death of his parents.

In the IDW comics, Darius Dun is the financier and benefactor of the Street Phantoms.

Street Phantoms
The Street Phantoms are a hi-tech group of criminals who appear in the Fast Forward series and later in the IDW comics.

In the IDW comics, the Street Phantoms work as the enforcers of Darius Dun.

Jammerhead

Jammerhead is the leader of the Street Phantoms in the 2003 series and as Jammer in the IDW comics.

Mutants
The following characters are mutant creatures that appeared in the different TV series, comics, action figures, and video games:

Ace Duck
Ace Duck was once a test pilot named Ace Conrad when he was caught in Krang's transport beam and cross-fused with a duck. Ace was later saved by the Teenage Mutant Ninja Turtles and became the pilot of their Turtle Blimp.

In 1987 TV series, made a cameo on TV.

In the Archie comics, Ace Duck is an alien from the planet Perdufus and a wrestler for Slump's Intergalactic Wrestling circuit of which he is reigning champion.

In the IDW comics, he is a boastful fighter pilot and one of the material witnesses sought by the Neutrinos to facilitate Krang's trial.

In the 2012 TV series episode "The Lonely Mutant of Baxter Stockman," Ace Duck was Baxter Stockman's 74th attempt to make a mutant army for Shredder. According to Stockman, he flies, swims and knows Taekwondo (a triple threat). Shredder considers it completely ridiculous and an absolute failure as he slashes the picture. As Ace Duck has human arms and is claimed to fly, it can be assumed that the wings are on his back like his previous incarnations did.

Alopex
Alopex is a mutant Arctic fox who was introduced in the IDW comic Micro-Series #1: Raphael and given a background story in Villains Micro-Series #4. She was created by Brian Lynch and designed by Kevin Eastman.

Alopex was an ordinary Arctic fox in Fairbanks, Alaska until she was experimented upon by humans and later rescued and trained by the Shredder. Initially an agent of the Foot Clan, she turned against them at the conclusion of the "City Fall" arc after the Shredder callously slew her old family, and became an ally of the Turtles and the crime-fighting partner of Angel Bridge AKA Nobody. However, she later fell under the sway of the immortal Kitsune and became a pawn in her subversive game to assume dominion over mankind. After the Turtles free her, she escapes to Alaska in shame, where she battles Kitsune's control over her mind. She is eventually rescued by Raphael and Angel and returned to New York. It's also implied that a romance is blossoming between her and Raphael.

A red fox version of Alopex features in the 2012 CGI episode "The Tale of Tiger Claw" as the sister (and fellow Krang mutation victim) of the antagonist Tiger Claw, with whom she had a deadly falling-out. Unlike the comic, this Alopex (voiced by Minae Noji) was a human mutated into a fox. After she and her brother were mutated, they joined the circus and eventually became professional assassins, much to her dismay. She cuts off Tiger Claw's tail and wears it around her waist as a trophy. When she arrives to New York to finish Tiger Claw off for good, she is convinced by the Turtles to spare him, but cuts off Tiger Claw's right arm when he tries to retaliate.

Armaggon
Armaggon is a mutant shark that originated in the Teenage Mutant Ninja Turtles Adventures comics. Armaggon came from the future and teams up with Shredder and Verminator-X. He was first seen in the "Mighty Mutanimals" prelude to his first appearance where he fought Ray Fillet and Merdude where Armaggon claimed that he had fought Ray Fillet before in the future.

Armaggon appears in the 2012 TV series, voiced by Ron Perlman. This version is a great white shark-like alien in a metallic suit (which can turn into a shark for space travel) described as "a bounty-hunter and space-assassin wanted in 87 Star Systems".

Armaggon also appears in the Super NES version of Teenage Mutant Ninja Turtles: Tournament Fighters as a playable fighter. He also appears as a boss in Teenage Mutant Ninja Turtles: Mutants in Manhattan.

Bloodsucker
Exclusive to the Mirage Studio comics, Bloodsucker was a normal leech until Donatello, Leonardo and Michelangelo decided to use it to get back at Raphael who had been disobeying Splinter and stalled their training. Raphael was afraid of leeches so the other Turtles decided to force Raphael to let the leech suck his blood. Bloodsucker sucked some of the mutagen out of Raphael and Raphael started to de-evolve back to a normal pet turtle. Bloodsucker started to evolve into a human-kind-of-thing. Bloodsucker later sucked out the rest of Raphael's mutagen. The other Turtles decided to capture Bloodsucker so they could get the mutagen back to Raphael. Finally, they found Bloodsucker and started a fight. During the battle Raphael (who looked like a normal pet turtle at this point) started biting Bloodsucker thus draining the stolen mutagen back. After a duel between them, Raphael had gained back all the mutagen from Bloodsucker and was back to his former self. Bloodsucker had also transformed back to a normal leech which Raphael freed back to the river it had come from.

Conservation Corps
The Conservation Corps is a group of mutant animals and ecological superheroes that are allies with the Teenage Mutant Ninja Turtles. They had their own three-part miniseries and have different elemental abilities. Each of the Conservation Corps members were mutated by an Enviro-Pod used by the alien Benevolence.

Firefly
Firefly is a mutant firefly and a member of the Conservation Corps with fire-manipulating abilities.

Green Horn
Green Horn is a mutant Indian rhinoceros and a member of the Conservation Corps with chlorokinetic abilities.

Sky Shark
Sky Shark is a mutant blue shark and a member of the Conservation Corps who is capable of flight.

Stone Hedgehog
Stone Hedgehog is a mutant hedgehog and a member of the Conservation Corps with rocky skin who can sling rocks.

Water Buffalo
Water Buffalo is a mutant bison and a member of the Conservation Corps with hydrokinetic abilities.

Dale McGillicutty
Dale Evans McGillicutty is an intelligent human mutant who the Turtles encounter in issue 16 ("A Teenage Mutant Ninja Turtles Story") of the Mirage Comics.

Doctor El
Doctor El is a witch doctor that was turned into a mutant elephant by Shredder to serve him. Shredder didn't know that elephants are friendly creatures and Doctor El sided with the Ninja Turtles.

Dopey
Dopey is a cap-wearing member of Rocksteady and Bebop's gang in the 80's Teenage Mutant Ninja Turtles series. In his later appearances, he appeared partially mutated and had gained a small elephant trunk of his original skin tone and remained mostly obscured from view by the other gang members. His mutated appearance was in reference to the 1980 film adaptation of  The Elephant Man. 
Dopey's name was solely sourced from an early storyboard for "Turtle Tracks."

In the IDW Comics, Dopey is an inhabitant of Mutant Town and instead has the appearance of a mutant shrew. His connections with Scrag, Grunt and Dumbo remain intact.

Dumbo
Dumbo is a very short, fat, and bald-headed member of Rocksteady and Bebop's gang in the 80's Teenage Mutant Ninja Turtles series. In his later appearances, he had the appearance of a mutant sloth. 
Dumbo's name is solely sourced from an early storyboard for "Turtle Tracks."

In the IDW Comics, Dumbo is an inhabitant of Mutant Town and has the appearance of a mutant dog. His connections with Scrag, Grunt and Dopey remain intact.

Groundchuck and Dirtbag
Groundchuck and Dirtbag are a mutant bull and mole and enemies of the Ninja Turtles.

They appeared in the 1980s Teenage Mutant Ninja Turtles episode "Planet of the Turtleoids" Pt. 1, "Planet of the Turtleoids" Pt. 2 and "Escape from the Planet of the Turtleoids" voiced by Robert Ridgely and Pat Fraley. They were both Shredder's latest creations after they were accidentally created by Rocksteady and Bebop at the zoo.

Groundchuck and Dirtbag were bosses in Teenage Mutant Ninja Turtles III: The Manhattan Project and Teenage Mutant Ninja Turtles: Shredder's Revenge. Dirtbag was a boss in Teenage Mutant Ninja Turtles III: Radical Rescue.

Grunt
Grunt is a member of Rocksteady and Bebop's gang in the 80's Teenage Mutant Ninja Turtles series who sports a yellow mohawk. In his later appearances, he had the appearance of a mutant reptile, likely a lizard or snake. Grunt's name was obtained from two separate production materials for the series, a size comparison chart and an early storyboard for the episode "Turtle Tracks."

Grunt also appeared in the Teenage Mutant Ninja Turtles comics that were published by Archie Comics.

In the IDW Comics, Grunt is an inhabitant of Mutant Town and appears as a mutant lizard. His connections with Scrag, Dumbo and Dopey remain intact.

Halfcourt
Halfcourt is a mutant giraffe with a basketball player motif and an ally of the Ninja Turtles.

Ruff the Ref
Ruff the Ref is a mutant flamingo with a referee motif who is Halfcourt's "Best Buddy." His action figure depicts him with a sling on his left leg.

Herman
Herman is a mutant hermit crab who debuts in the IDW comic "Teenage Mutant Ninja Turtles" #38. He was Old Hob's attempt at making a mutant and appears as a member of the Mighty Mutanimals.

Hothead
Hothead is a Samurai dragon ally of the Ninja Turtles. Released as an action figure in 1992 Hothead, aka Kavaxas is a villain and a demon in the 2012 CGI TV series. Hothead was created by Ryan Brown. He is voiced by Mark Hamill.

Hot Spot
Hot Spot is a mutant dalmatian with a firefighter motif and an ally of the Ninja Turtles.

King Lionheart
King Lionheart was a Shakespearian actor who was turned into a mutant lion by Shredder to serve as his "King of the Mutants." This didn't go according to plan as King Lionheart sided with the Ninja Turtles.

Manmoth
Manmoth is a mutant mammoth who debuted in Teenage Mutant Ninja Turtles Meets Archie #1. In the "Origin of the Species" story, Manmoth was a caveman who was mutated into a mutant mammoth by Shredder in his plans to use him on the Ninja Turtles.

In the IDW comics Manmoth is one of the Pantheon and brother of Rat King and Kitsune.

Mona Lisa
Mona Lisa is a mutant lizard.

In the 1987 cartoon, Mona (voiced by Pat Musick) was a human girl trying to get a college degree in biology, who was kidnapped on a fishing trip and forced to work as an assistant to a pirate named Captain Filch when he attacked her boat. In trying to foil Filch's plans, she was mutated into a mutant lizard with an encounter to radiation. After this, she vowed to stop Filch. She and Raphael met when Filch was holding a yacht full of people hostage and teamed together to stop him. Afterward, she followed the Turtles back to New York but was never seen again.

In the 2012 cartoon, Mona (voiced by Zelda Williams) was introduced as Lt. Y'Gythgba, a high-ranking Salamandrian (an alien race of humanoid newts and salamanders) who got stranded on the icy moon of Thalos 3 alongside her commanding officer Commander G'Throkka after a haphazard encounter with the Turtles and Professor Honeycutt. She was openly hostile to the Turtles, especially to Raphael, but the two began to warm to each other after discovering their mutual love of battle. Unable to pronounce her true Salamandrian name, Raphael instead nicknames her after the painting of the most beautiful woman on Earth. The two shared a kiss before the Salamandrians and Turtles went their separate ways in peace. After a number of encounters in space, Mona returns to Earth to enlist the help of the Turtles to combat Newtralizer and his new ally, Lord Dregg. After the latter's defeat, she requests to her commander to be stationed on Earth to protect the planet and be closer to Raphael. Raphael suggests she joins the Mighty Mutanimals in her spare time.

In the IDW Comics Mona Lisa was a human student studying physics at the city college before she was transformed into a mutant lizard by Old Hob's Mutagen Bomb. In the newly established Mutant Town (which was built for other victims of the Mutagen Bomb), Mona helps Alopex's shelter by stealing from the Mutanimals' supplies.

Monty Moose
Monty Moose is a baby moose that was mutated into a humanoid appearance after being separated from his herd and falling into Lake Ooze (a secret stash for Shredder's ooze). He has since taken a mounty motif and has sided with the Ninja Turtles.

Bob the Beaver
Bob the Beaver is a mutant beaver who is Monty Moose's "Best Buddy."

Muckman
Muckman is a garbage mutant who is an ally of the Teenage Mutant Ninja Turtles.

In the 1987 cartoon, Muckman (voiced by Townsend Coleman impersonating Jackie Gleason) started out as a garbageman named Garson Greer. He and his fellow garbageman Joe Junkee were exposed to mutagen when Rocksteady and Bebop accidentally poured mutagen on them where Muckman was transformed into a garbage mutant. Muckman and Joe Eyeball became allies with the Turtles when they realized that Rocksteady and Bebop were behind their mutation. Even though the Turtles planned to cure them, Muckman and Joe Eyeball declined stating that they have become comfortable with their mutant forms.

In the 2012 cartoon, Muckman (voiced by Grant Moninger) was introduced as Garson Grunge (originally voiced by Nolan North), a humble sewer worker who had encounters with mutants in the past, such as getting attacked by Leatherhead, a Squirrelanoid, Fungus Humongous' fear spores and Pizza Face's minions. Following the Krang's invasion on the city, he was seen working as a garbageman when he heard a commotion involving the Turtles fighting Bebop and Rocksteady at an abandoned Krang lab and got hit in the face with a canister of mutagen (which Bebop intentionally threw at Michelangelo) while investigating it. As the result of falling into the dumpster, Grunge mutated into a 6 ft. humanoid mutant made entirely out of garbage with a banana peel cap, an exposed and eroded skeleton, a toxic vomit, control over other garbage and dissolving abilities. Convinced by Joe Eyeball to be a hero when he found the Purple Dragons mugging a man, Muckman stopped them and beat them up. The man witnessed the action and talked about it on Joan Grody's show, becoming New York's new sensation. When the Turtles and April found Muckman and Joe Eyeball, Muckman blamed the Turtles for his mutation, yet both groups had to leave before Joan Grody could get a full glimpse of the Turtles. Upon seeing the news on Muckman, Bebop and Rocksteady planned to take advantage of this and looked for him. When they found him, he thought they were with the Turtles until they claimed that they weren't with them.

They then convinced him to help them rob a Krang lab again by claiming that it contains a cure, though Joe became suspicious of their motives. When the Turtles caught up to them, Muckman began to attack, but Bebop stopped him and told him to get the chemical while he and Rocksteady dealt with the Turtles. Muckman joined the fight and the Turtles were defeated, but they tried to reason with him and were all knocked out by Bebop's grenade. Rocksteady threw Muckman into the lab and is blasted with the Krang's traps. Muckman found the chemical they were looking for but was blasted by another trap as Rocksteady took it from him. As a result, Muckman helped the Turtles by shooting slime at the chemical, destroying it while allowing Bebop and Rocksteady to retreat. After apologizing to the Turtles, he covered up their existence by telling Joan Grody that they were just people in costumes like the Pulverizer. He later subsequently befriended Mondo Gecko and was recruited as muscle of the Mighty Mutanimals as they help the Turtles save the Earth from getting destroyed by the Triceratons, though sadly their efforts proved futile.

Joe Eyeball
Joe Eyeball is a small creature who is Muckman's sidekick.

In the 1980s Teenage Mutant Ninja Turtles episode "Muckman Messes Up," Joe Eyeball (voiced by Rob Paulsen impersonating Art Carney) started out as a garbage man named Joe Junkee. He and his fellow garbageman Garson Greer were exposed to mutagen when Rocksteady and Bebop accidentally poured mutagen on them where Joe Eyeball was transformed into a small green mutant with eyestalks. Muckman and Joe Eyeball became allies with the Turtles when they realized that Rocksteady and Bebop were behind their mutation. Even though the Turtles planned to cure them, Muckman and Joe Eyeball declined stating that they have become comfortable with their mutant forms. Having developed feeling for Irma, Joe Eyeball gave her a chunk of slime to remember him by.

Joe Eyeball appears in the 2012 Teenage Mutant Ninja Turtles episode "The Noxious Avengers" voiced by Grant Moninger. This version is Muckman's left eye that was given life of its own and serves as Muckman's conscience, though he is capable of acting independently.

Old Hob
Old Hob is a character that appeared in the IDW run of the "Teenage Mutant Ninja Turtles" comics.

Old Hob was originally a stray cat who came across the Turtles and Splinter as they were getting mutated. Old Hob got exposed to it and tried to attack the pre-mutated Raphael only for Splinter to claw his right eye out. Old Hob became a mutant cat wearing an eyepatch and later teamed up with Baxter Stockman for revenge. Eventually Old Hob left Stockman and later forms the Mighty Mutanimals with him as the leader and evolves into an anti-hero.

Pete
Pete is a mutant pigeon who makes comic his debut in the IDW comic "Teenage Mutant Ninja Turtles" #35. He was Old Hob's first attempt at creating a mutant. He lacked the expertise and the proper compounds to create intelligence and Pete came out less than smart. This leads him to kidnap Lindsey Baker, a former Stockgen scientist and try to convince her to make mutants for him. Pete appears as a member of Old Hob's Mighty Mutanimals.

In the 2012 TV series, Pete (voiced by A.J. Buckley) was an ordinary common wood pigeon that was mutated by the Krang into a humanoid form. During his captivity, he came in contact with April O'Neil's father Kirby and also a prisoner of the Krang. Kirby O'Neil taught Pete how to speak and had him deliver a message to his daughter April O'Neil in which he wanted to warn her of impending danger. Under unexplained circumstances, Pete was either released by the Krang after the experiment or escaped his captivity. Pete stalked April O' Neil for a few days and frightened her with his alleged attack before the turtles ambushed him and tackled him to the ground. After Pete had been captured, he was able to tell them his true intentions, he informs April and the Turtles that the Krang intend to detonate a mutagen bomb into the city. He then revealed the location of the Krang base in exchange for a loaf of sourdough bread. He then led the Turtles to the hideout of the Krang where O'Neil was being held. He would later reappear as a member of the Mighty Mutanimals along with Slash, Leatherhead, and Dr. Rockwell, helping the Turtles defeat the Krang and save New York. By the time of "Mutant Gangland" Pete apparently quit the team, Slash saying "We don't talk about Pete".

Perri Grey
Perri Grey is an intern at Mergenterprise who debuted in "Teenage Mutant Ninja Turtles Adventures Special" #11. Her boss Dr. Koss was in league with an alien species named the Grem. When Perri and April O'Neil stumble onto this plot, both of them end up captured where April was mutated into a mutant turtle while Perri Grey was mutated into a mutant flying squirrel. After the Grem were defeated, April was restored by Perri who chose to remain in her mutant form where she would reverse-engineer a retro-mutagen batch if she needs to.

Pizza Face
Pizza Face is a pizza maker and an enemy of the Ninja Turtles.

In the toyline, Pizzaface is Shredder's crazed culinary creator. Pizzaface had a plan to become the most powerful pizza chef ever. So he zapped himself in his Mutagen Oven hoping the energy would bake him with badness. But the hungry Ninja Turtles burst into the parlor and pulled Pizzaface out. Now this half-baked bozo wants to get even with the Turtles for foiling his formula. The effects of the Mutagen Oven had enabled Pizzaface to control anything pizza-related. Possessing the power of the pizza pie, Pizzaface is the ultimate Turtle nightmare: traveling from parlor to parlor, he terrorizes the Turtles, trying to turn them into tasty teen topping. Armed with flying pizzas and a Pizza Box Shield, this peg-legged pizza piper follows the Foot Clan, even though he's only got one good leg. And what's worse? He delivers.

In the 2012 TV series, Pizza Face (voiced by John DiMaggio) was introduced as Antonio, an Italian pizza chef who ran Antonio's Pizza until he ingested mutagen thinking that it would be a good pizza topping, mutating himself into a huge mutant pepperoni and mushroom pizza with arms, a mouth, eyes made of pepperoni (resembling Pizza the Hut from the movie Spaceballs). He has control over pizzas around him. The pizzas have a mind of their own and desire to be consumed which will cause the person who ate them to fall into a zombie-like state "to serve their delicious master". He first appeared in the episode "Pizza Face," where Michelangelo went to Antonio's Pizza after his free Antonio's pizza attacked him when he refused to eat it. Mikey found Pizza Face's victims and was attacked by them. Upon returning to the lair, he found his fellow Turtles and Splinter affected as he fought off Pizza Face's pizzas, interrogating one of them to find out who he works for. The pizza told Michelangelo about Pizza Face's origin and plans to feed off them. After putting the pizza into the freezer with Ice Cream Kitty, Michelangelo infiltrated Antonio's Pizza restaurant where Pizza Face was starting to make the humans into calzones for him to feed off of. Michelangelo confronted Pizza Face (who actually liked being called that) and fought the pizza-controlled Turtles until he was trapped in Pizza Face's cheese. Upon eating his way out of the cheese, he fought his way past Pizza Face's victims was swallowed up by Pizza Face only to eat his way out. Michelangelo threatened Pizza Face to free his victims or else. Pizza Face did what Michelangelo wanted as every one he brainwashed was freed. Even though it seemed like a nightmare to Michelangelo, it turned out that Pizza Face's slice had survived and was hiding in one of the pizza boxes.

The precursor for Pizza Face's design may have come from a character in the 80s series.

Sandstorm
Sandstorm is a mutant camel and an ally of the Ninja Turtles.

Sally Pride
Sally Pride is a mutant lioness who appears in the IDW comics. She alongside Man Ray are shown as mutant prisoners of the Null Group at the trainyard. Man Ray are later freed by Old Hob's Mighty Mutanimals and join up with them.

Scrag
Scrag is a member of Rocksteady and Bebop's gang in the 80's Teenage Mutant Ninja Turtles series. In his later appearances, he had the appearance of a mutant bat. Scrag's name came from a coloring book that featured the Teenage Mutant Ninja Turtles characters and the earlier storyboard for "Turtle Tracks."

Scrag also appeared in the Teenage Mutant Ninja Turtles comics that were published by Archie Comics.

In the IDW Comics, Scrag is an inhabitant of Mutant Town. His connections with Grunt, Dumbo and Dopey remain intact.

Scratch
Scratch is a mutant cat with a prisoner motif and is one of Shredder's mutant allies.

Scratch appeared as a boss in Teenage Mutant Ninja Turtles III: Radical Rescue.

Jail Bird
Jail Bird is a mutant bird who is Scratch's sidekick.

Sergeant Bananas
Sergeant Bananas is a gorilla who mutated after Shredder had dumped Retromutagenic Ooze into his jungle gym and he walked through it. Sergeant Bananas became an ally of the Ninja Turtles.

Larry the Lemur
Larry the Lemur is a mutant ring-tailed lemur who is Sergeant Bananas' "Best Buddy."

Scumbug
Scumbug is a mutant cockroach. He was created by Mirage Studios artist Ryan Brown.

In the toyline, Scumbug's bio states that he was an exterminator that was hired by Shredder to deal with a bug infestation in the Technodrome. The exterminator got accidentally oozed and mutated into the mutant cockroach named Scumbug. Unable to face other customers, Scumbug saddled up with Shredder as his ace assassin in order to exterminate the Turtles.

Scumbug first appeared in Teenage Mutant Ninja Turtles Adventures #10 in which he fought the Turtles in the sewers and was later confronted by Wyrm. As Scumbug and Wyrm fought knee-deep in sewer water, they accidentally got electrocuted by nearby power lines. However, they would both return in a future issue, and were slated to return in the final story arc of the series, before its cancellation.

Scumbug appeared in the Teenage Mutant Ninja Turtles episode "Night of the Rogues" voiced by Pat Fraley. He was among the enemies of the Turtles (alongside Rat King, Leatherhead, Slash, Tempestra, Chrome Dome, and Antrax) brought together by Shredder in hopes of defeating the turtles. Oddly enough while this was the first appearance of Scumbug and Antrax, April and the TMNT were familiar with the insectoid villains.

Scumbug debuts in the 2012 Teenage Mutant Ninja Turtles episode “The Insecta Trifiecta”. Mutated by Baxter Stockman, Scumbug is a spider/beetle hybrid.

Uncanny Trio
The Uncanny Trio is a group of mutant animals that first appear in "Teenage Mutant Ninja Turtles Adventures" #27.

Hallocat
Hallocat was originally the cat of a trucker until he fell into the mutagen. Turning into a mutant cat, he hired Nevermore & Nocturno to destroy our reptilian heroes.

Nevermore the Scarecrow
Nevermore the Scarecrow was originally a crow until it got exposed to mutagen. He turned in to mutant crow & teamed up with Hallocat & Nocturno the get rid of the turtles.

Nocturno the Owl
Nocturno the Owl was originally an owl until it got exposed to mutagen. He transformed into a mutant owl & teamed up with Hallocat & Nevermore to create "The Uncanny Trio" to destroy the Ninja Turtles.

Verminator-X
Verminator-X is a mutant cyborg cat who is exclusive to the "Teenage Mutant Ninja Turtles Adventures" comics. In the future, Manx is the apprentice of Donatello. However, Manx begins augmenting his body with cybernetics, which causes him to grow insane. He then allies with the Shredder and Armaggon. Verminator-X made one last attempt to destroy the TMNT and allied himself with Craniac. He is only apparent in the future timelines, and eventually has a Catharsis in a controversial book in which Raphael is willing to kill him for the greater good, resulting in destroying the machine that had taken-over and poisoned Verminator's mind. At the end of this arc, ultimately Verminator survives and becomes the heroic Manx once again rejoining his friends.

Walkabout
Walkabout is a mutant kangaroo from Australia that wears an eyepatch and specializes in crocodile hunting. His origin was not stated. All that we know is that he came to Manhattan where he met the Ninja Turtles and sided with them in their fight against the Foot Clan.

Kid Kangie
Kid Kangie is an unidentified mutant who is Walkabout's "Best Buddy."

Wyrm
Wyrm was originally a trashman who slipped and fell into Shredder's trash bin where he mutated into a mutant flatworm.
He was created by Mirage Studios artist Ryan Brown.

In Teenage Mutant Ninja Turtles #10 Wyrm appeared battling Scumbug. Both mutants were eventually electrocuted.

In the 2012 TV series, Wyrm (voiced by Dwight Schultz) is a reality-warping being with worm-like hair that was imprisoned in a cube.

Other major characters

Dimension X

Venus de Milo

Venus De Milo was introduced as the first female Ninja Turtle in Ninja Turtles: The Next Mutation and was originally created specifically for that iteration. Unlike the four original Turtles she wasn't trained in Ninjutsu and rather utilised ancient shamanistic magic and manipulated orbs to fight. She dons an aqua colored bandanna. Within the continuity of the series when Splinter rescued the Turtles, he accidentally left Venus behind. She made her way to Chinatown and was found and raised as a daughter by a Shinobi magician who named her Mei Pieh Chi. 

A new version of Venus was released in the IDW Comics continuity with Issue #127 on March 30, 2022. This incarnation is a Frankenstein-like creature with telepathic abilities created by the mad mutant surgeon Doctor Jasper Barlow from the remains of a female Punk Frog named Bonnie.

Jennika
Jennika (nicknamed Jenny) is the second female turtle introduced in the franchise after Venus de Milo. She was created for the IDW Comics series. She wears a yellow mask and her weapon of choice are tekko kagi claws. She was initially a human foot clan member. After being defeated in an assassination attempt on Splinter, she was put under the tutelage of Leonardo and began to warm up to her new family. After being stabbed by Karai, Jennika was given an emergency blood transfusion from Leonardo. The mutagen and turtle DNA in Leo's blood bonded with Jennika and mutated her into a mutant turtle. Despite her loyalty to the team, due to her near-death experience, Jennika still has unresolved anger issues towards Karai.

Baron Draxum
Baron Draxum (nicknamed Barry) is from Rise of the Teenage Mutant Ninja Turtles, (voiced by John Cena in season one, Roger Craig Smith in season two). A maroon-skinned Yōkai warrior and alchemist from the Hidden City with maroon hair and faun-like legs, who has the power to augment his own body by crushing purple pods in his hands, and can manipulate giant purple tentacle-like vines to grab objects, enemies, or as a means of transportation. As the self-proclaimed protector of all Yōkai, Baron Draxum seeks to mutate humanity to avert a prophecy predicting the destruction of the Yōkai. 
An incident amidst an earlier attempt to turn humanity into Yōkai led to the creation of the Teenage Mutant Ninja Turtles while causing Hamato Yoshi's transition into Splinter, attempting to win the former to his side before joining forces with the Foot Clan to reassemble the Kuroi Yōroi and revive Shredder. In the first season, Draxum exploits a loophole in the Foot's rules to becomes its leader through tactics that enable him to gain a shard of the Kuroi Yōroi. In the episode "End Game", Draxum equips the restored Kuroi Yōroi armor intending to destroy humanity once and for all. The Foot Lieutenant and Foot Brute address him as Shredder, but he rejects the title, confused with the name "Shredder". Due to a Jupiter Jim action figure being wedged in a hole in the back of the helmet, the Turtles managed to attack that part and cause the armor to fall off of Draxum, though the armor is revived after siphoning some of Draxum's life force, degrading his body to nearly a corpse and weakening his powers considerably. 

After the Foot Recruit emerged from the portal she opened to assist her senseis, Draxum used his weakened abilities to escape through it. In "Repairin' the Baron", Mikey takes in a weakened Draxum and teaches him to tolerate humans with Raph's help. After saving a mother and daughter from the Ferris wheel  while losing his mask in the process, and slowly starting to regain his lost power, he starts to tolerate humans, after which Raph and Mikey get him a job working at the cafeteria at April's school. In the four-part "Finale" episodes, Draxum realized that Shredder was the threat to the Yōkai mentioned in the prophecy, not humanity.

Crossover characters
Several characters from other comic book series have crossed-over into the TMNT universes. Notable appearances are listed below:

Batman

Cerebus the Aardvark

Flaming Carrot

Gizmo

Knight Watchman

Power Rangers

Savage Dragon

Miyamoto Usagi

Miyamoto Usagi is a samurai rabbit and master swordsman from an alternative universe's 16th century Edo period in Japan, where animals are the dominant species, not humans. He appeared in two episodes of the 1987 series. Usagi Yojimbo is a comic book series created by Stan Sakai starring the rōnin hero rabbit, Miyamoto Usagi, which had several crossovers with the TMNT comics; apparently the TV show writers did not understand the distinction and misnamed the character after the comic book.

The character returned for the 2003 animated series with his actual name Miyamoto Usagi, and became a friend and close ally of the turtles, especially developing a strong friendship with Leonardo, since both are swordsmen, and during Season 4 he is summoned by Splinter to talk with Leonardo about Leo's new harsher attitude (as a result of the Turtles and Splinter nearly sacrificing themselves against Utrom Shredder at the end of the third season). Leonardo also ended up in Usagi's dimension when Ultimate Draco scattered the five mutants to different parts of the multiverse. In the series finale, he is invited to April and Casey's wedding.

Vanguard

Wild West C.O.W.-Boys of Moo Mesa

The Wild West C.O.W.-Boys of Moo Mesa are a trio of anthropomorphic cattle that work as cowboys that defend their home of Cowtown from various criminals. The group consists of Marshal Moo Montana, Dakota Dude, and Cowlorado Kid.

In issue #21 of Tales of the TMNT, the Teenage Mutant Ninja Turtles aided the C.O.W.-Boys into stopping the Masked Bull (the criminal alias of Sheriff Terrorbull) from stealing a magic crystal shard.

See also
 List of Teenage Mutant Ninja Turtles (1987 TV series) characters
 List of Ninja Turtles: The Next Mutation characters
 List of Teenage Mutant Ninja Turtles (2003 TV series) characters
 List of Teenage Mutant Ninja Turtles (2012 TV series) characters
 List of Rise of the Teenage Mutant Ninja Turtles (2018 TV series) characters

References

Lists of characters in American television animation
Lists of comics characters
 
Lists of fictional animals in comics
Lists of animated science fiction television characters
Characters